= Crater (disambiguation) =

A crater is a landform appearing as a depression.

Crater may also refer to:

== Music ==
- Crater (Daniel Menche and Mamiffer album), 2016
- Crater (Fission album), 2004

== Places ==
- Crati or Crater, a river in southern Italy
- Crater, California, United States
- Crater (Aden), a district in Yemen

== Film ==
- Crater, a 2023 film

== Other uses ==
- Crater (constellation), in astronomy
- The Crater (novel), 1847, by James Fenimore Cooper
- Joseph Force Crater (fl. 1889–1930), New York judge who disappeared

== See also ==
- Crate (disambiguation)
- Crater lake (disambiguation)
- Cratering (disambiguation)
- Krater, a Greek vessel used to mix wine and water (the original meaning)
- Makhtesh, a crater-like formation created by erosion
