= Crate (disambiguation) =

A crate is a large strong container, often made of wood.

Crate or Crates may also refer to:

== Arts and entertainment ==
- Crate Entertainment, a US video game developer
- Cajón or crate, a percussion instrument in Peru
- "The Crate", a 1979 short story by Stephen King

== People ==
- Crates (name), a given name and surname
- Crates (comic poet) (probably fl. late 450s or very early 440s BC), Old Comedy poet and actor from Athens
- Crates (engineer), 4th century BC engineer who accompanied Alexander the Great
- Chuck Crate (1916–1992), Canadian fascist and leader of the Canadian Union of Fascists

== Places ==
- Crate Township, Chippewa County, Minnesota, United States

== Technology ==
- Modular crate electronics
- Ilyushin Il-14 (NATO reporting name: Crate), a Soviet aircraft
- Crate engine, an automobile engine spec replacement shipped in a crate container. Crate Late Model and Crate Modified are classes named after the specification
- CrateIO, a fully searchable document oriented data store
- Packages in rust are called crates.

== See also ==
- Crater (disambiguation)
- Krait, a venomous snake
- Dog crate
- Gestation crate, a metal enclosure used in intensive pig farming
- Wooden box
