= The Crater =

The Crater may refer to:

- The Crater (manga), a 1969 manga by Osamu Tezuka
- The Crater (novel), an 1847 novel by James Fenimore Cooper
- The Crater (radio play), a 1948 Australian radio play

== See also ==
- Battle of the Crater, took place during the American Civil War
- Crater (disambiguation)
