= Crates (name) =

Crates is a Greek given name (Κράτης), pronounced as two syllables. It may refer to:

- Crates (comic poet) (probably fl. late 450s or very early 440s BC), Old Comedy poet and actor from Athens
- Crates (engineer), 4th century BC engineer who accompanied Alexander the Great
- Crates of Thebes (c. 365 – c. 285 BC), Hellenistic Cynic philosopher
- Crates of Athens (died 268–264 BC), Polemon's successor as head of the Platonic Academy
- Crates of Mallus, 2nd century BC Greek grammarian and Stoic philosopher
- Crates of Tralles, a rhetorician

== See also ==
- Danny Crates (born 1973), British former Paralympic sprinter
- Crate (disambiguation)
- Crates Bay, Antarctic Peninsula
- Craits, a card game sometimes spelled Crates
