= Badwater =

Badwater may refer to:

- Badwater Basin, Death Valley, California; the lowest elevation point in North America
- Badwater, California, an unincorporated community located near the basin
- Badwater Ultramarathon, run between the basin and the slopes of Mount Whitney
- Badwater Crater the lowest point on Mars.
