= Craterus (disambiguation) =

Craterus may refer to:

- Craterus of Macedon, King of Macedon in 399 BC
- Craterus, Macedonian general of Alexander the Great
- Craterus (historian), half-brother of Antigonus II Gonatas, compiler of historical documents relative to the history of Attica
- Crates (engineer), also known as Craterus
