= Crater =

Depression caused by an impact or geologic activity

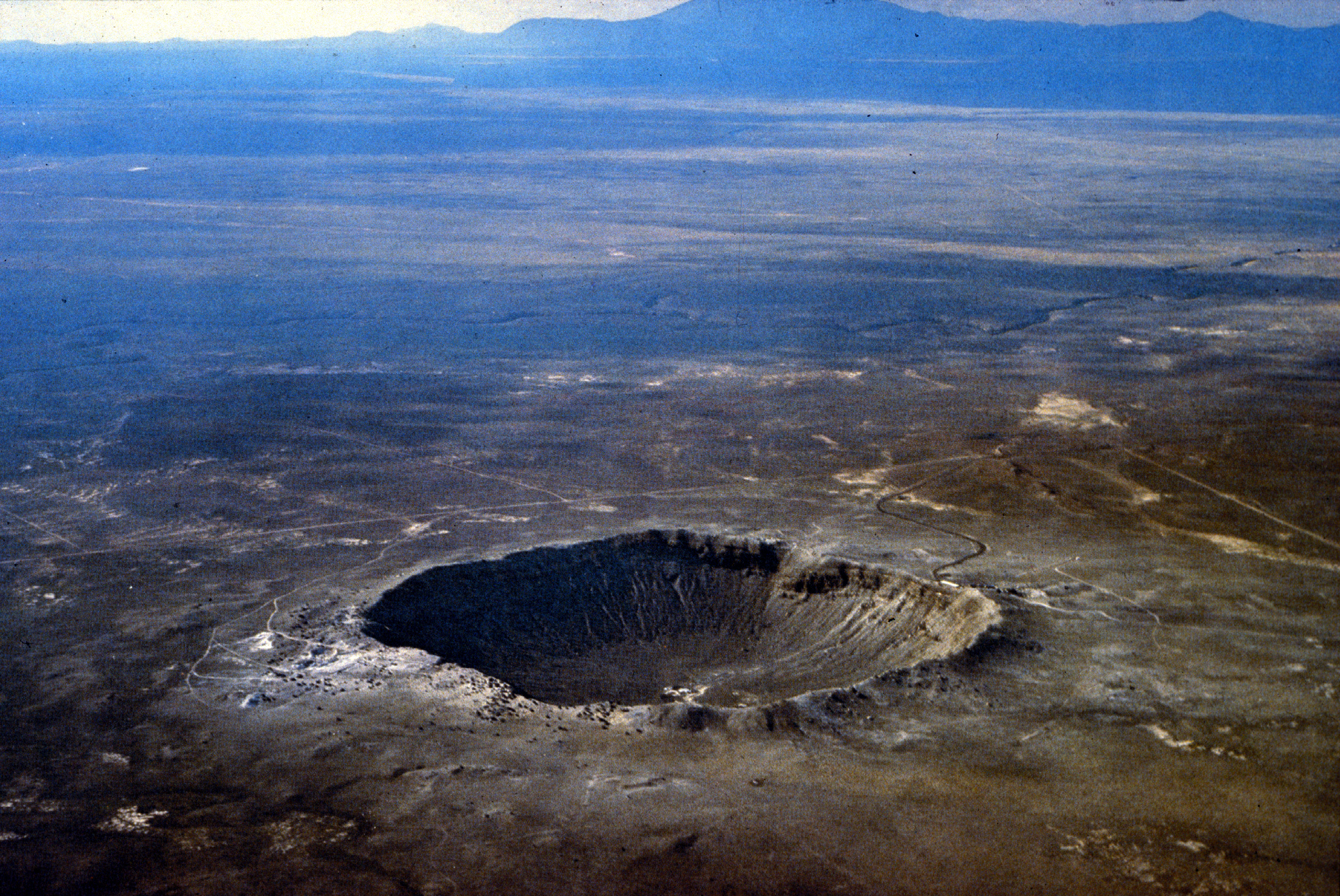
50,000-year-old Meteor Crater east of Flagstaff, Arizona, U.S.

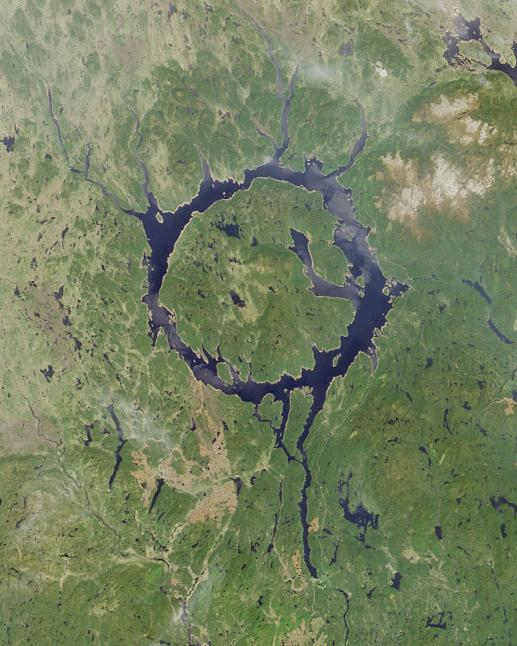
Lake Manicouagan in Quebec, Canada, an impact crater lake

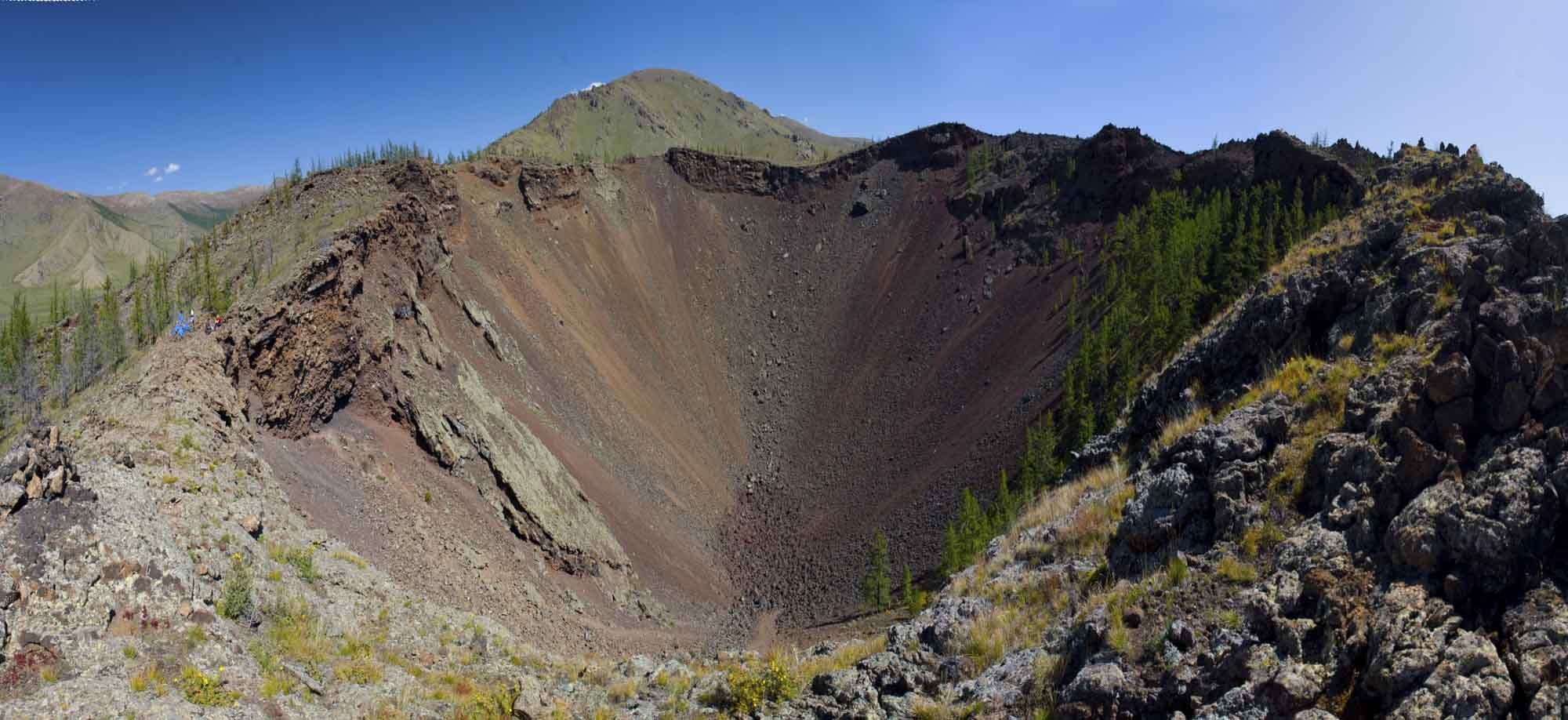
Pano Horgoo volcano crater in Mongolia

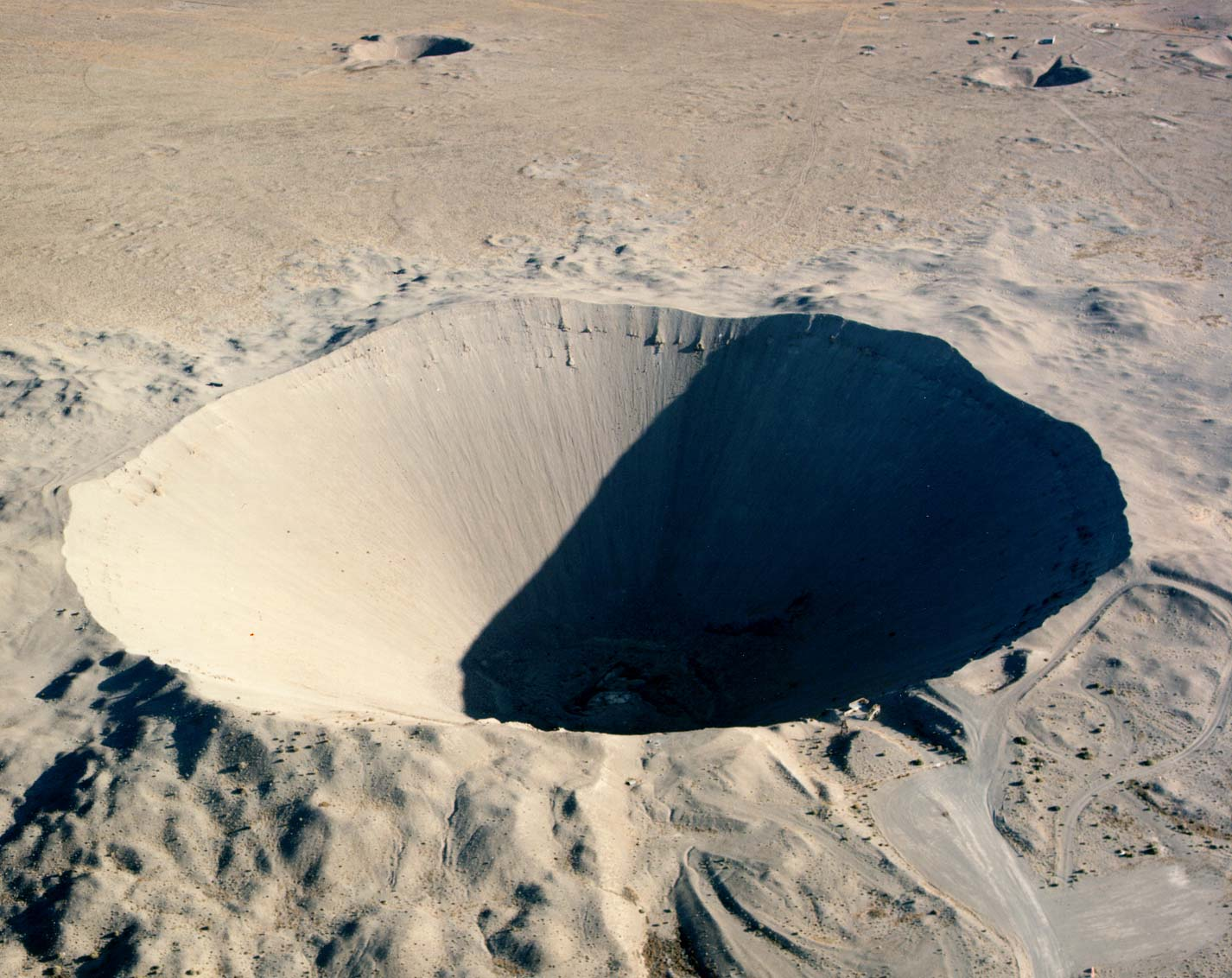
Explosion crater created by the Sedan shallow underground nuclear test explosion in Nevada

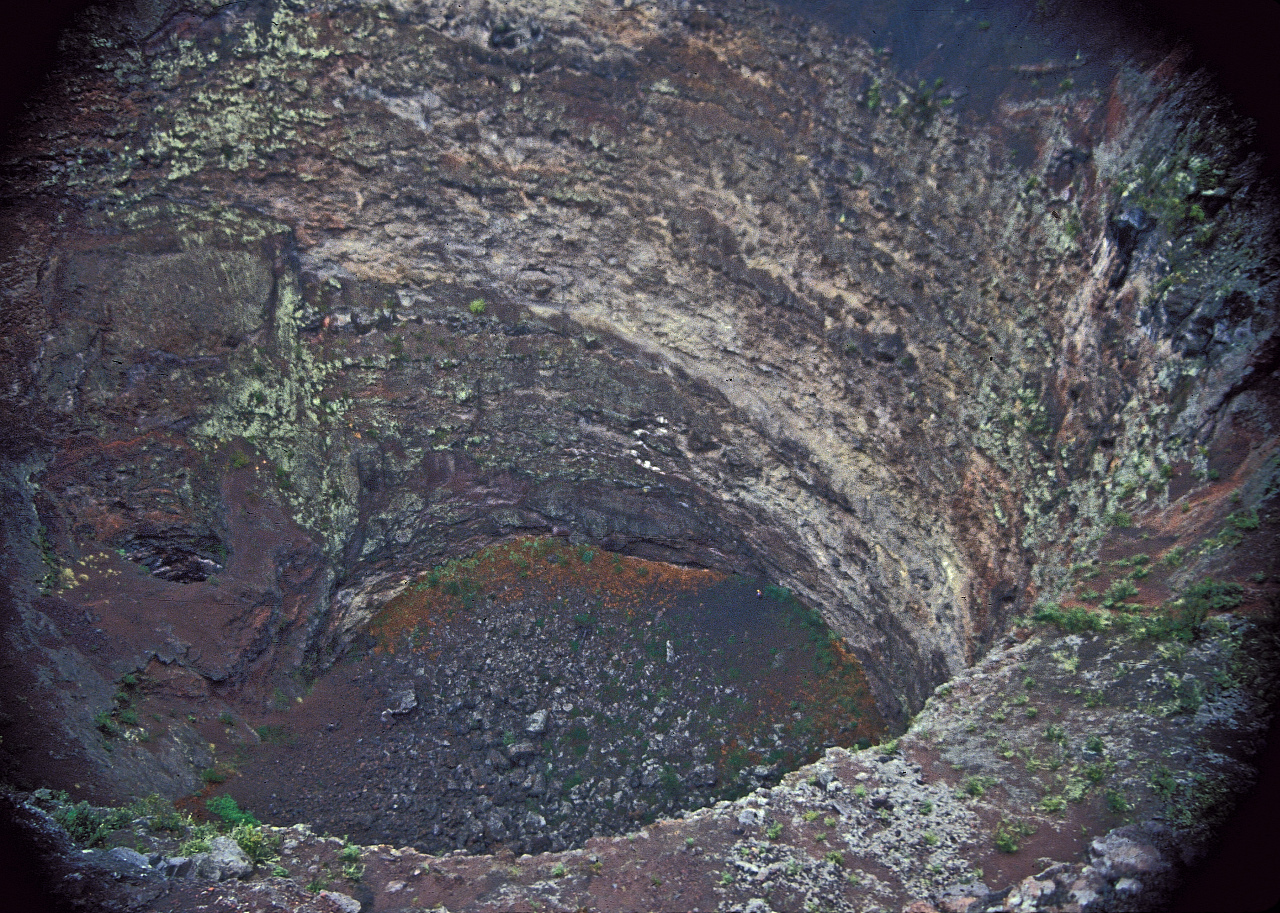
Deep pit crater on Hualalai Hawaii

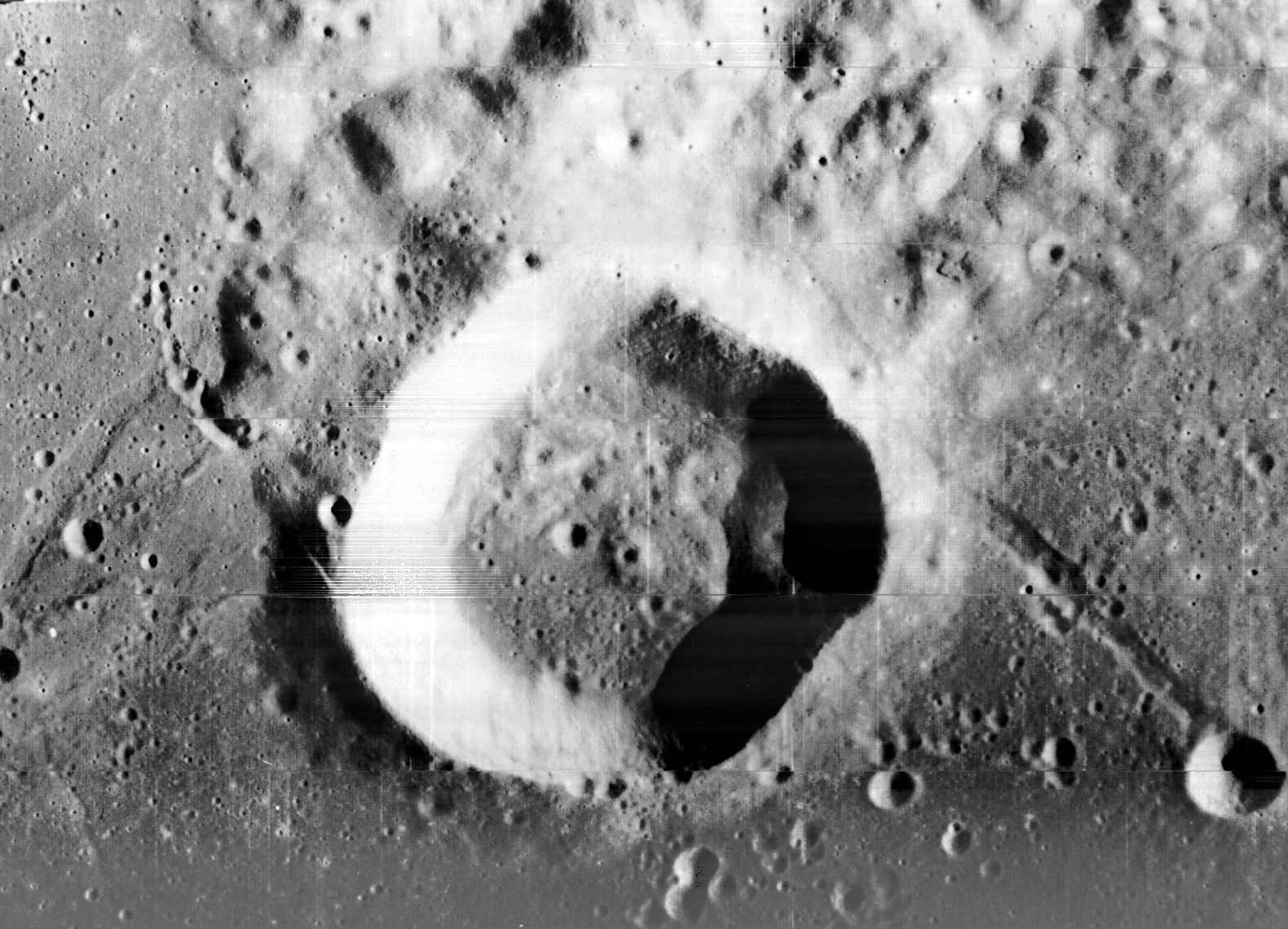
The lunar crater Webb, as seen from Lunar Orbiter 1. Several smaller craters can be seen in and around Webb.

A crater is a landform consisting of a hole or depression on a planetary surface, usually caused either by an object hitting the surface, or by geological activity on the planet. A crater has classically been described as: "a bowl-shaped pit that is formed by a volcano, an explosion, or a meteorite impact". On Earth, craters are "generally the result of volcanic eruptions", while "meteorite impact craters are common on the Moon, but are rare on Earth".

A 1961 New Scientist article speculating on the later-dismissed theory that the craters on the Moon might be volcanic in origin noted that "craters produced by volcanism are blessed with advantages of terrain and mineralization not found on impact craters". A crater may become a crater lake if conditions are suitable. This requires that the crater have relatively even and solid walls, and a source of water such as floodwaters, rain, snow, springs, or other groundwater.

== Types ==
=== Impact crater ===
An impact crater is a depression in the surface of a planet, moon, or other solid body in the Solar System or elsewhere, formed by the hypervelocity impact of a smaller body. In contrast to volcanic craters, which result from explosion or internal collapse, impact craters typically have raised rims and floors that are lower in elevation than the surrounding terrain. All lunar craters are impact craters, ranging from microscopic craters on lunar rocks returned by the Apollo program and small, simple, bowl-shaped depressions in the lunar regolith to large, complex, multi-ringed impact basins. Meteor Crater is a well-known example of a small impact crater on Earth.

Impact craters are the dominant geographic features on many solid Solar System objects including the Moon, Mercury, Callisto, Ganymede and most small moons and asteroids. On other planets and moons that experience more active surface geological processes, such as Earth, Venus, Europa, Io and Titan, visible impact craters are less common because they become eroded, buried or transformed by tectonics over time. Where such processes have destroyed most of the original crater topography, the terms impact structure or astrobleme are more commonly used. In early literature, before the significance of impact cratering was widely recognised, the terms cryptoexplosion or cryptovolcanic structure were often used to describe what are now recognised as impact-related features on Earth.

=== Volcanic crater ===
A volcanic crater is a bowl-shaped depression in the ground caused by volcanic activity, usually located above the volcano's vent. During volcanic eruptions, molten magma and volcanic gases rise from an underground magma chamber, through a conduit, until they reach the crater's vent, from where the gases escape into the atmosphere and the magma is erupted as lava. A volcanic crater can be of large dimensions, and sometimes of great depth. During certain types of explosive eruptions, a volcano's magma chamber may empty enough for an area above it to subside, forming a type of larger depression known as a caldera. A maar is a broad, low-relief volcanic crater caused by a phreatomagmatic eruption (an explosion which occurs when groundwater comes into contact with hot lava or magma). A maar characteristically fills with water to form a relatively shallow volcanic crater lake which may also be called a maar. These lakes may become soda lakes, many of which are associated with active tectonic and volcanic zones.

=== Explosion crater ===
An explosion crater is produced by an explosion near or below the surface of the ground. A crater is formed by an explosive event through the displacement and ejection of material from the ground. It is typically bowl-shaped. High-pressure gas and shock waves cause three processes responsible for the creation of the crater, these being plastic deformation of the ground, projection of material (ejecta) from the ground by the explosion, and spallation of the ground surface. Two processes partially fill the crater back in, the immediate fall-back of ejecta, and later erosion and landslides of the crater lip and wall. The relative importance of the five processes varies, depending on the height above or depth below the ground surface at which the explosion occurs and on the composition of the ground. Differences in these characteristics will yield craters of different shapes, sizes, and other characteristics.

=== Pit crater ===
A pit crater (also called a subsidence crater or collapse crater) is a depression formed by a sinking or collapse of the surface lying above a void or empty chamber, rather than by the eruption of a volcano or lava vent. Pit craters are found on Mercury, Venus, Earth, Mars, and the Moon.

Pit craters are often found in a series of aligned or offset chains and in these cases, the features is called a pit crater chain. Pit crater chains are distinguished from catenae or crater chains by their origin. When adjoining walls between pits in a pit crater chain collapse, they become troughs. In these cases, the craters may merge into a linear alignment and are commonly found along extensional structures such as fractures, fissures and graben. Pit craters usually lack an elevated rim as well as the ejecta deposits and lava flows that are associated with impact craters. Pit craters are characterized by vertical walls that are often full of fissures and vents. They usually have nearly circular openings.

=== Subsidence crater ===
A subsidence crater is a depression from an underground (usually nuclear) explosion. Many such craters are commonly present at bomb testing areas; one notable example is the Nevada Test Site, which was historically used for nuclear weapons testing over a period of 41 years.

Subsidence craters are created as the roof of the cavity caused by the explosion collapses. This causes the surface to depress into a sink (which subsidence craters are sometimes called; see sink hole). It is possible for further collapse to occur from the sink into the explosion chamber. When this collapse reaches the surface, and the chamber is exposed atmospherically to the surface, it is referred to as a chimney. It is at the point that a chimney is formed through which radioactive fallout may reach the surface. At the Nevada Test Site, depths of 100 to 500 meters (330 to 1,640 ft) were used for tests. When the material above the explosion is solid rock, then a mound may be formed by broken rock that has a greater volume. This type of mound has been called "retarc", "crater" spelled backwards.

When a drilling oil well encounters high-pressured gas which cannot be contained either by the weight of the drilling mud or by blow-out preventers, the resulting violent eruption can create a large crater which can swallow a drilling rig. This phenomenon is called "cratering" in oil field slang. An example is the Darvaza gas crater near Darvaza, Turkmenistan.

== See also ==
- Caldera, a large cauldron-like depression formed following the evacuation of a magma chamber/reservoir
- Crater lake (disambiguation)
- Maar, a type of volcanic crater caused by a phreatic eruption or explosion
- Makhtesh, a crater-like formation created by erosion
