= Crates of Mallus =

Ancient Greek philosopher

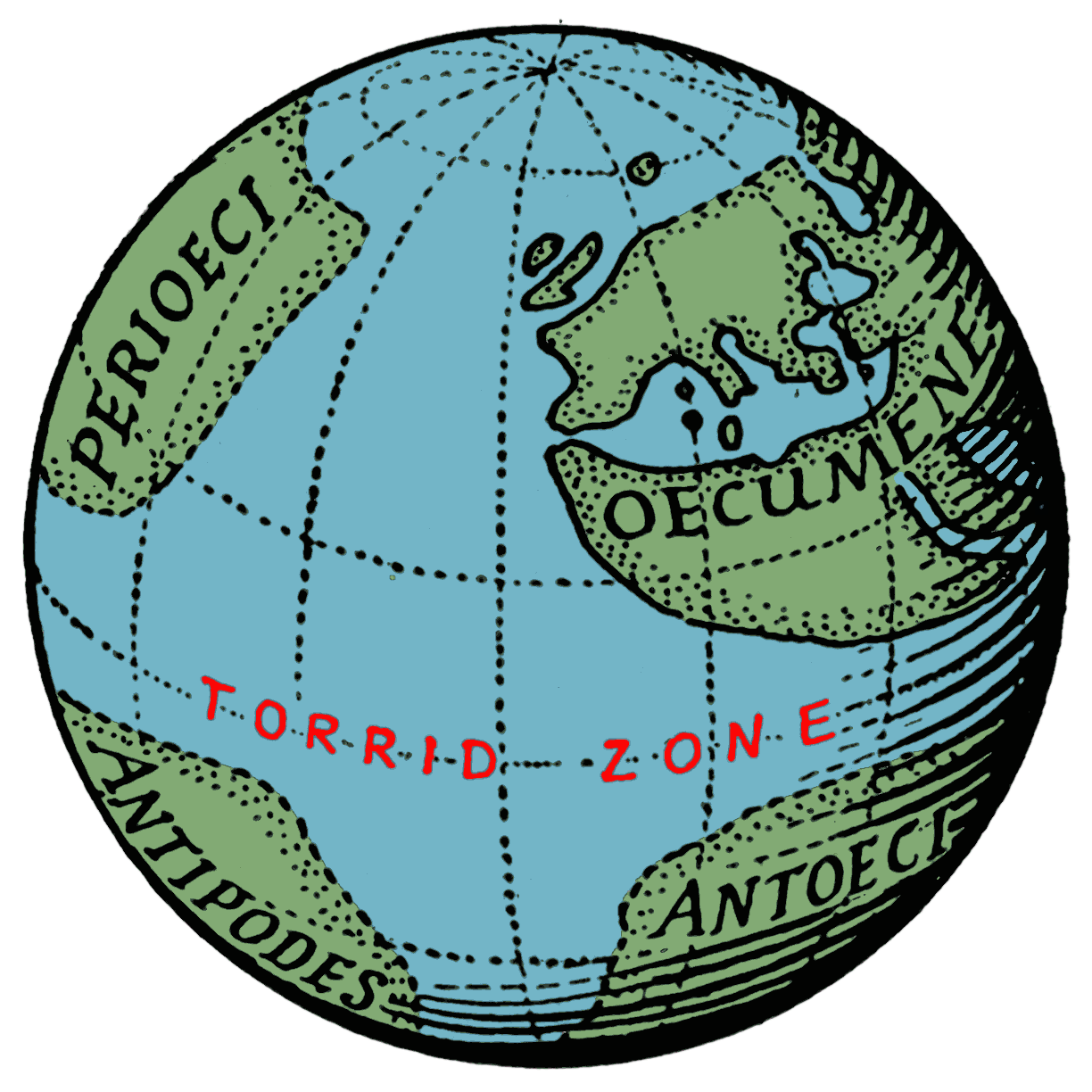
The Terrestrial Sphere of Crates of Mallus (c. 150 BCE), showing the region of the antipodes in the southern half of the western hemisphere and the torrid zone.

Crates of Mallus (Ancient Greek: Κράτης ὁ Μαλλώτης, Krátēs ho Mallṓtēs; fl. 2nd century BC) was a Greek grammarian and Stoic philosopher, leader of the literary school and head of the library of Pergamum. He was described as the Crates from Mallus to distinguish him from other philosophers by the same name. His chief work was a critical and exegetical commentary on Homer. He is also famous for constructing the earliest known globe of the Earth. Crates Bay, in Antarctica, is named after Crates of Mallus.

== Life ==
He was born in Mallus in Cilicia, and was brought up at Tarsus, and then moved to Pergamon, and there lived under the patronage of Eumenes II, and Attalus II. He was the founder of the Pergamon school of grammar, and seems to have been at one time the head of the library of Pergamon. Among his followers were Hermias (Κρατήτειος Ἑρμείας mentioned in sch. Hom. Il. 16.207a), Zenodotus of Mallus and Herodicus of Babylon.

He visited Rome as ambassador of either Eumenes, in 168 BC, or Attalus in 159 BC. Having broken his leg after falling into an open sewer, he was compelled to stay in Rome for some time and delivered lectures which gave the first impulse to the study of grammar and criticism among the Romans.

== Works ==
Crates made a strong distinction between criticism and grammar, the latter of which he regarded as subordinate to the former. A critic, according to Crates, should investigate everything which could throw light upon literature; the grammarian was only to apply the rules of language to clear up the meaning of particular passages, and to settle the text, prosody, accentuation, etc. From this part of his system, Crates derived the surname of Kritikos.

Like Aristarchus of Samothrace, Crates gave the greatest attention to the works of Homer, from his labours upon which he was also surnamed Homerikos. He wrote a commentary on the Iliad and Odyssey in nine books. Some fragments of this commentary are preserved by the scholiasts and other ancient writers. His principles were opposed to those of Aristarchus, who was the leader of the Alexandrian school. Crates was the chief representative of the allegorical theory of exegesis, and maintained that Homer intended to express scientific or philosophical truths in the form of poetry.

Besides his work on Homer, Crates wrote commentaries on the Theogony of Hesiod, on Euripides, on Aristophanes, and probably on other ancient authors; a work on the Attic dialect; and works on geography, natural history, and agriculture, of which only a few fragments exist.

== The Globe of Crates ==
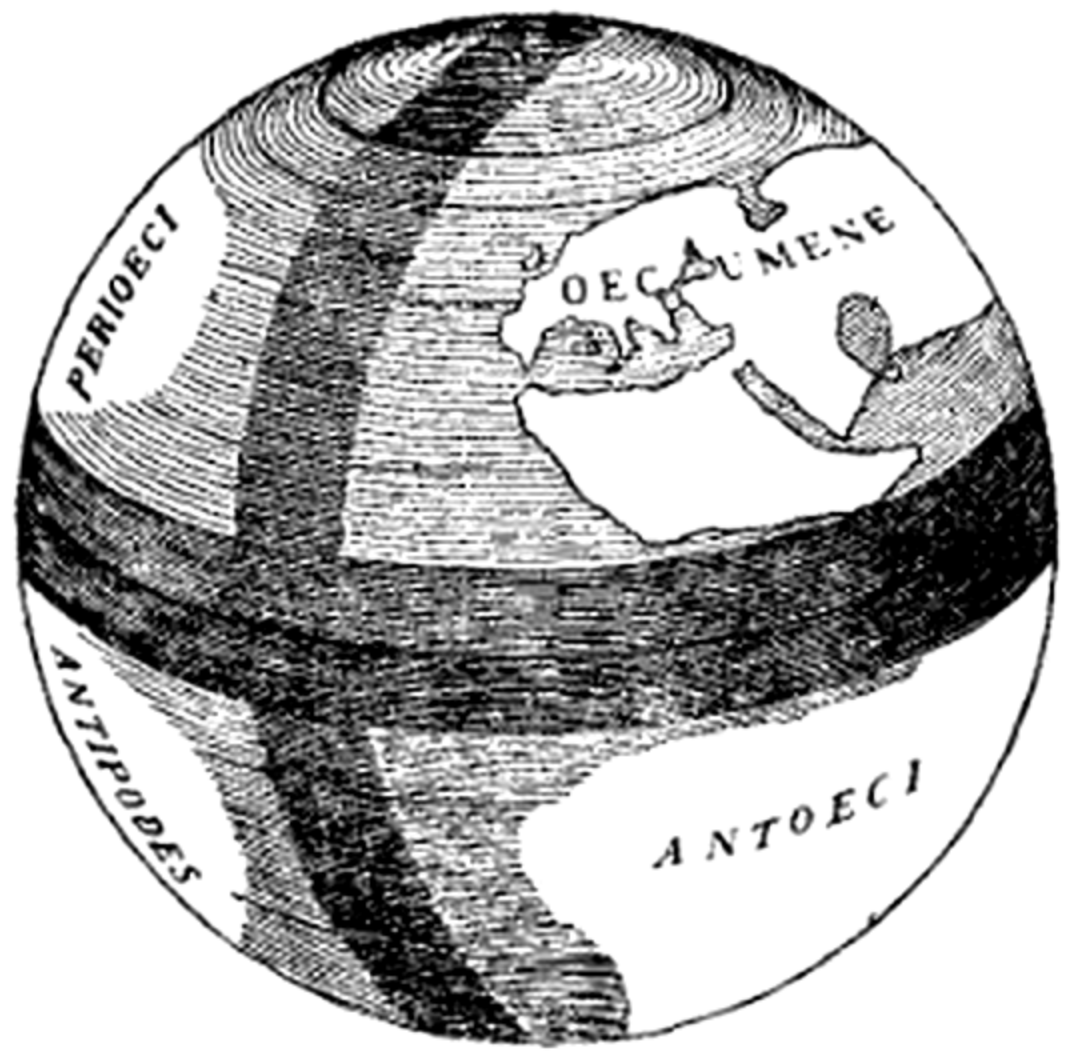
The Globe of Crates of Mallus (c. 150 BC) as imagined by a 20th century artist

According to Strabo, Crates devised a globe representing the Earth, which is thus the earliest known globe representing the Earth:

We have now traced on a spherical surface the area in which we say the inhabited world is situated; and the man who would most closely approximate the truth by constructed figures must necessarily take for the earth a globe like that of Crates, and lay off on it the quadrilateral, and within the quadrilateral put down the map of the inhabited world. But since the need of a large globe, so that the section in question (being a small fraction of the globe) may be large enough to receive distinctly the appropriate parts of the inhabited world and to present the proper appearance to observers, it is better for him to construct a globe of adequate size, if he can do so; and let it be no less than ten feet in diameter.

Following the theory of five climatic zones, Crates considered that the torrid zone is occupied by the Ocean and that, by analogy, one can imagine people living beyond the torrid zone:

For Crates, following the mere form of mathematical demonstration, says that the torrid zone is "occupied" by Oceanus and that on both sides of this zone are the temperate zones, the one being on our side, while the other is on the other side of it. Now, just as these Ethiopians on our side of Oceanus, who face the south throughout the whole length of the inhabited land, are called the most remote of the one group of peoples, since they dwell on the shores of Oceanus, so too, Crates thinks, we must conceive that on the other side of Oceanus also there are certain Ethiopians, the most remote of the other group of peoples in the temperate zone, since they dwell on the shores of this same Oceanus; and that they are in two groups and are "sundered in twain" by Oceanus.

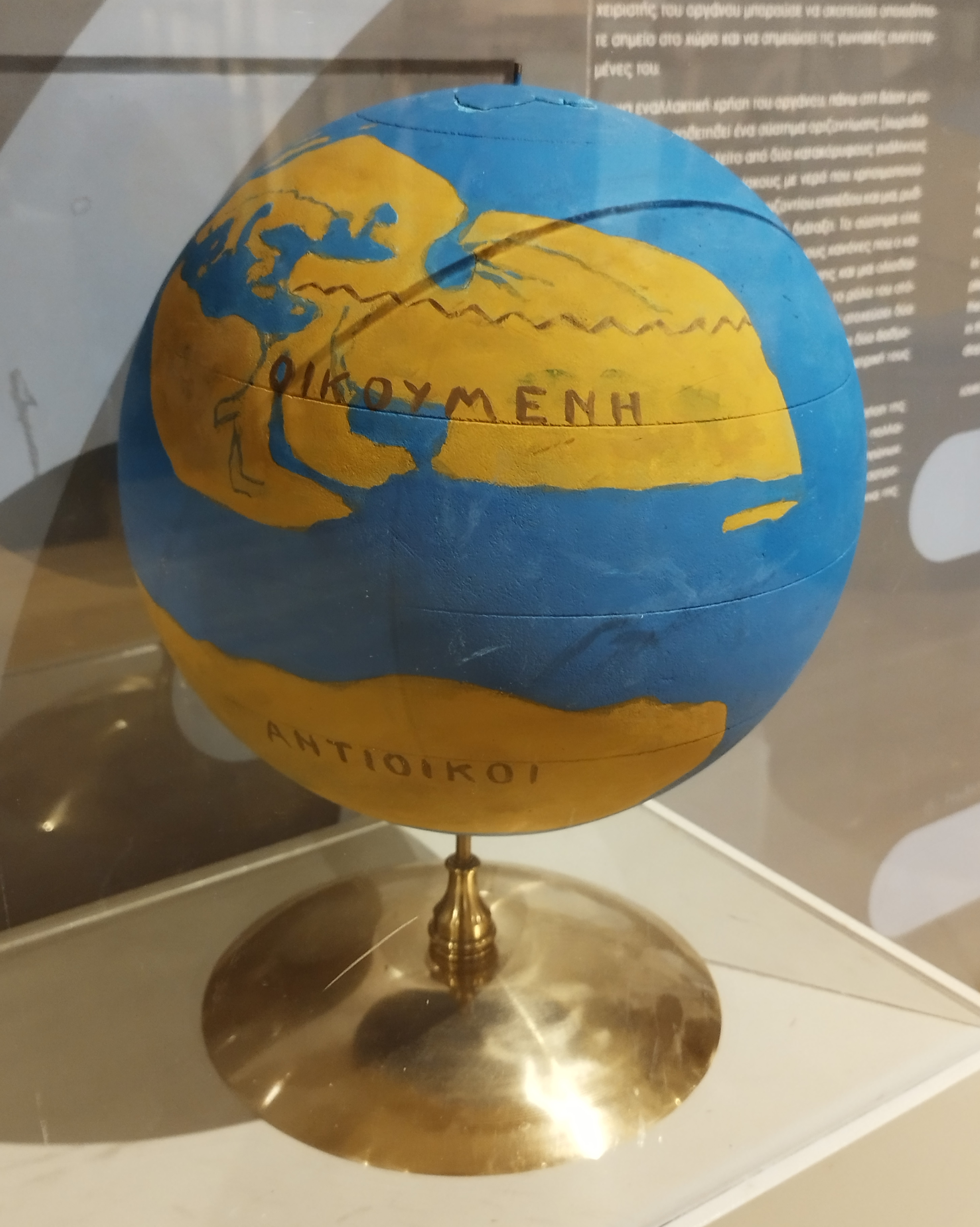
A modern reconstruction of the globe of Crates of Mallus (2nd c. B.C.), in Kotsanas Museum of Ancient Greek Technology, Athens, Greece.

The classic drawing of the sphere displays the known world, or Oecumene (Europe, North Africa, and Asia), with three other continents, labeled the Perioeci, the Antipodes, and the Antioeci. Crates' Perioeci and Antipodes arguably do exist, corresponding roughly to North America and South America respectively, but the continent of the Antioeci, Terra Australis, does not, except in fragments (Australasia and southern Africa). The earth does, in fact, have a ring of water around it, but at the 60th parallel south, not at the Equator.
