= Cratering =

Cratering may refer to:

- The formation of craters
  - Particularly, impact craters
- A reindeer digging behaviour
- Anti-runway penetration bomb, sometimes referred to as cratering weapons.
