= Hellas Planitia =

Planitia on Mars

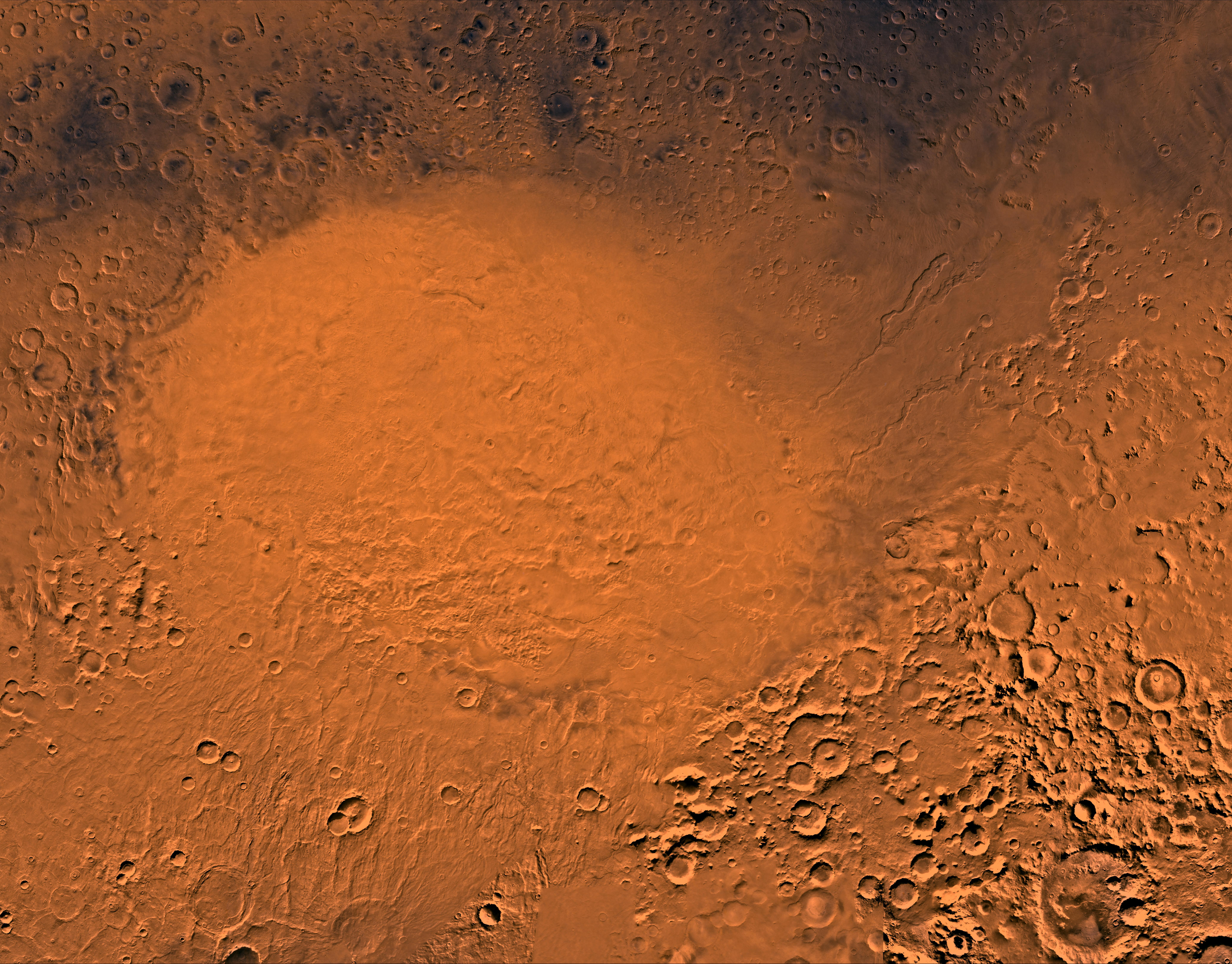
- Viking orbiter image mosaic of Hellas Planitia
- Location: Hellas quadrangle, Mars
- Coordinates: 42.4°S 70.5°E
- Diameter: c. 2,300 km (1,400 mi)
- Impactor diameter: c. 370 km
- Age: c. 4 billion years

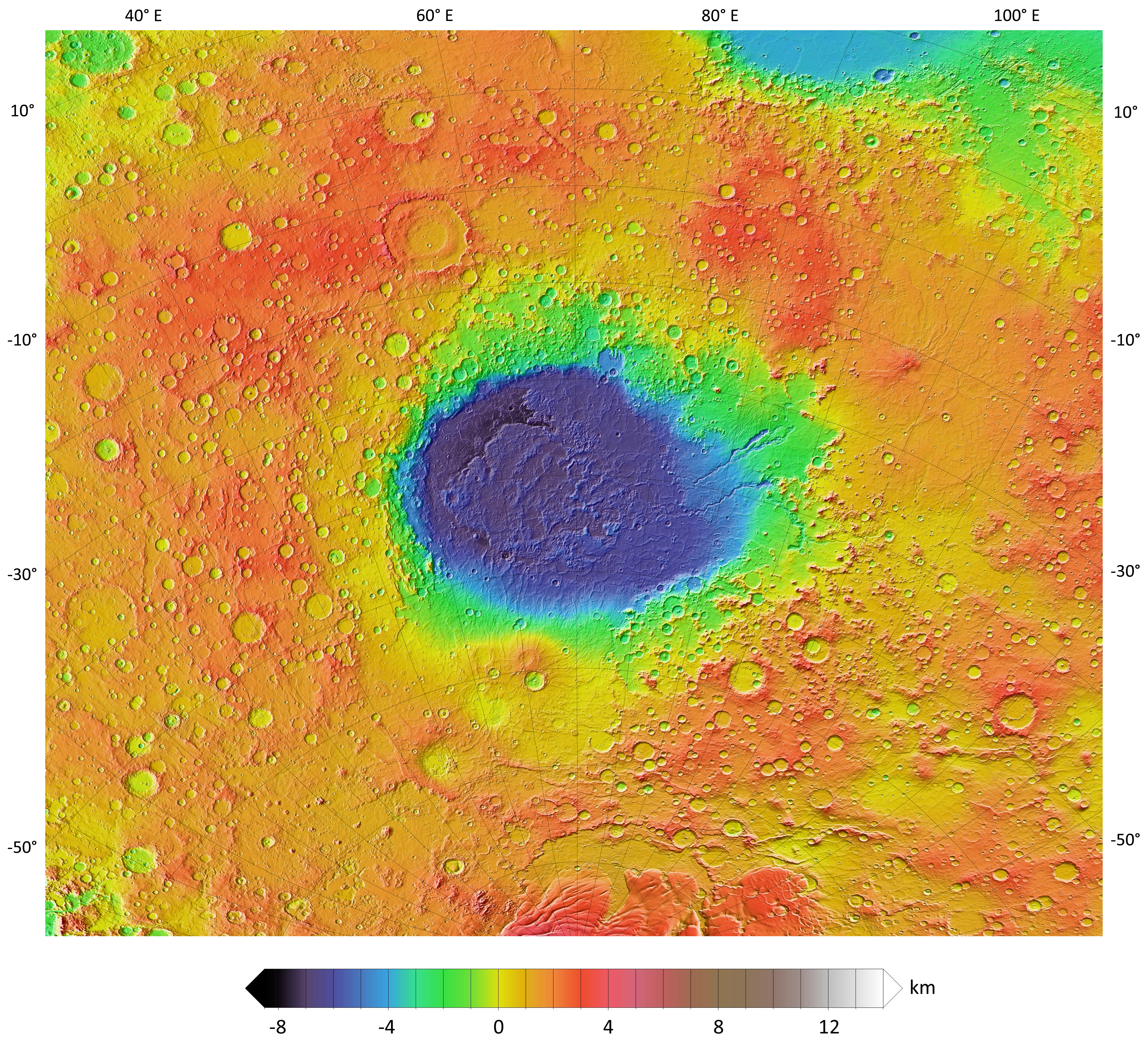
Topographic map of Hellas Planitia and its surroundings in the southern uplands, from the MOLA instrument of Mars Global Surveyor. The crater depth is 7,152 m (23,465 ft) below the standard topographic datum of Mars.

Hellas Planitia /ˈhɛləs pləˈnɪʃiə/ is a plain located within the huge, roughly circular impact basin Hellas (Note: Technically, Hellas is an 'albedo feature'.) located in the southern hemisphere of the planet Mars. Hellas is the fourth or fifth-largest known impact crater in the Solar System. The basin floor is around 7,152 m (23,465 ft) deep, 3,000 m (9,800 ft) deeper than the Moon's South Pole-Aitken basin, and extends about 2,300 km (1,400 mi) east to west. It is centered at 42.4°S 70.5°E. It features the lowest point on Mars, serves as a known source of global dust storms, and may have contained lakes and glaciers. Hellas Planitia spans the boundary between the Hellas quadrangle and the Noachis quadrangle.

== Description ==
With a diameter of about 2,300 km (1,400 mi), it is the largest unambiguous well-exposed impact structure on the planet; the obscured Utopia Planitia is slightly larger (the Borealis Basin, if it proves to be an impact crater, is considerably larger). Hellas Planitia is thought to have been formed during the Late Heavy Bombardment period of the Solar System, between 4.1–3.8 billion years ago, when a protoplanet or large asteroid, suggested to be around 370 kilometres (230 mi) in diameter, hit the surface.

The altitude difference between the rim and the bottom is over 9,000 m (30,000 ft). Despite being deeper than the Moon's South Pole-Aitken basin, Hellas's rim peaks are significantly less prominent. This may be because large Martian impacts such as Hellas induced global hot rainfall and meltwater flows that degraded crater rims, including their own. The crater's depth of around 7,152 m (23,465 ft) below the topographic datum of Mars explains the atmospheric pressure at the bottom: 12.4 mbar (1,240 Pa or 0.18 psi) during winter, when the air is coldest and reaches its highest density. (Note: "... the maximum surface pressure in the baseline simulation is only 12.4 mbar. This occurs in the bottom of the Hellas basin during northern summer.") This is 103% higher than the pressure at the topographical datum (610 Pa, or 6.1 mbar, or 0.09 psi) and above the triple point of water, suggesting that the liquid phase could be present under certain conditions of temperature, pressure, and dissolved salt content. It has been theorized that a combination of glacial action and explosive boiling may be responsible for gully features in the crater.

Some of the low elevation outflow channels extend into Hellas from the volcanic Hadriacus Mons complex to the northeast, two of which Mars Orbiter Camera images show contain gullies: Dao Vallis and Reull Vallis. These gullies are also low enough for liquid water to be transient around Martian noon, if the temperature were to rise above 0° Celsius.

Hellas Planitia is antipodal to Alba Patera. It and the somewhat smaller Isidis Planitia together are roughly antipodal to the Tharsis Bulge, with its enormous shield volcanoes, while Argyre Planitia is roughly antipodal to Elysium, the other major uplifted region of shield volcanoes on Mars. Whether the shield volcanoes were caused by antipodal impacts like that which produced Hellas, or if it is mere coincidence, is unknown.

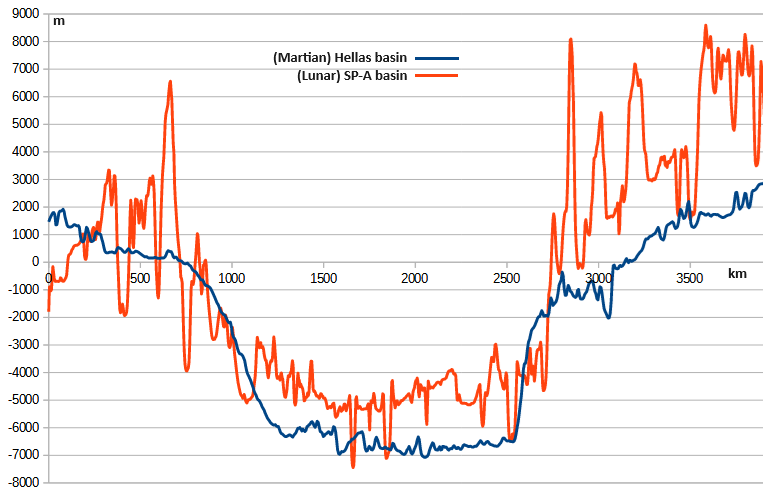
Elevation profiles along south to north transects across Mars's Hellas basin and the Moon's South Pole-Aitken basin, created with Lunar Quickmap and Mars Quickmap

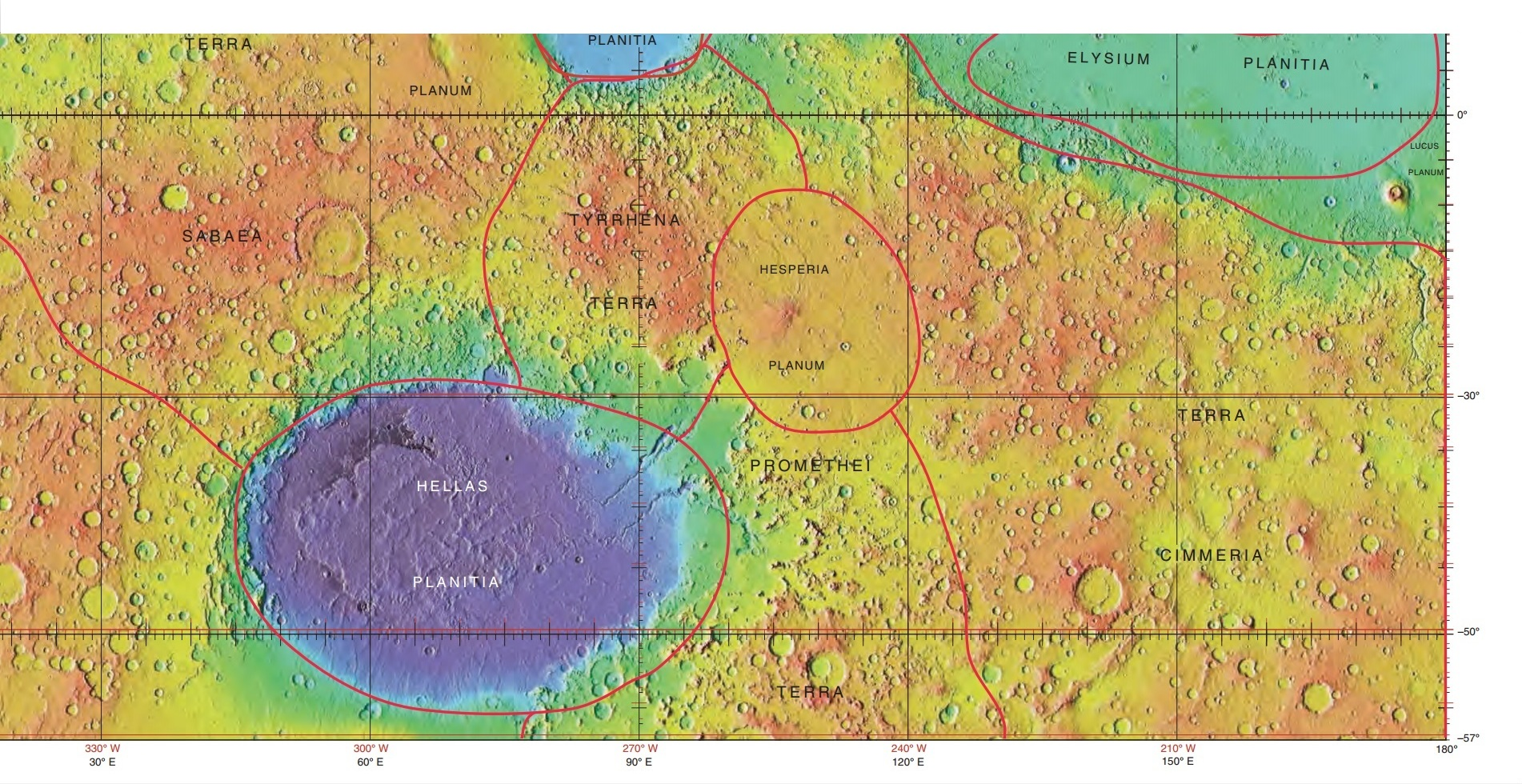
MOLA map showing boundaries of Hellas Planitia and other regions

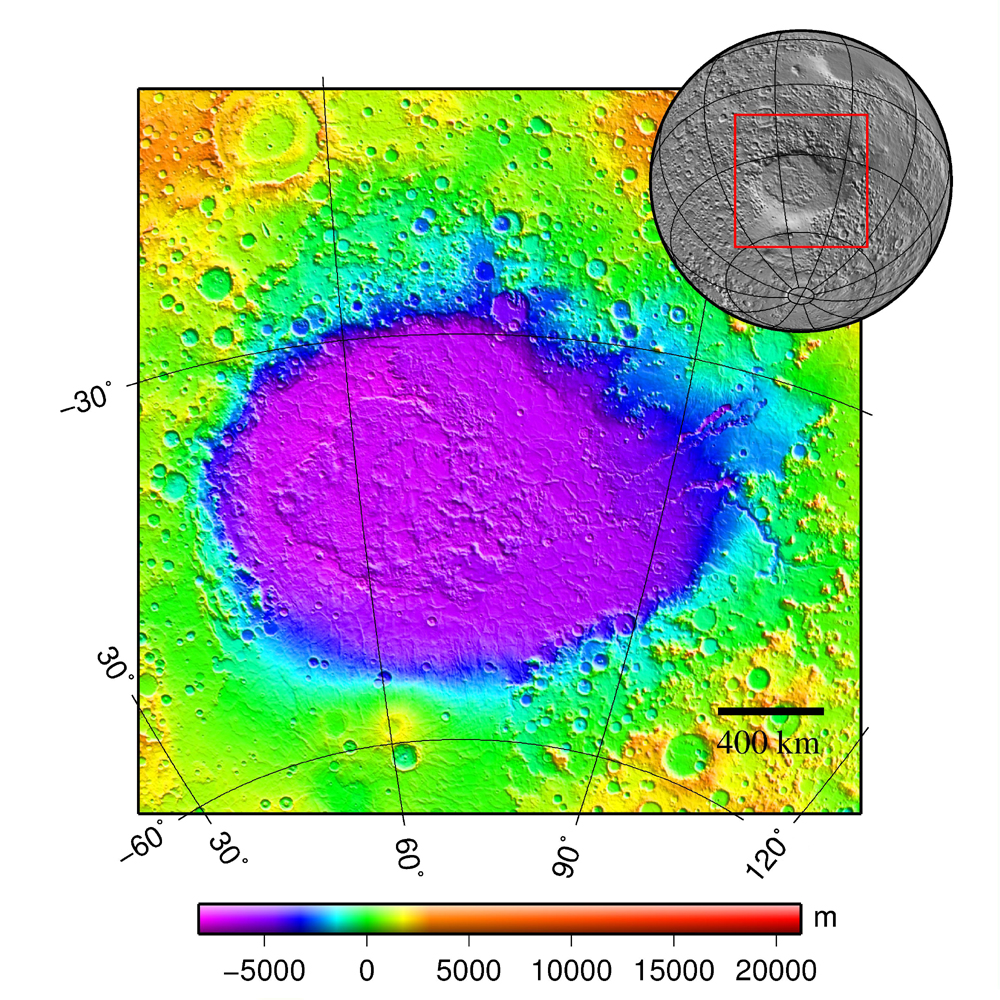
Geographic context of Hellas

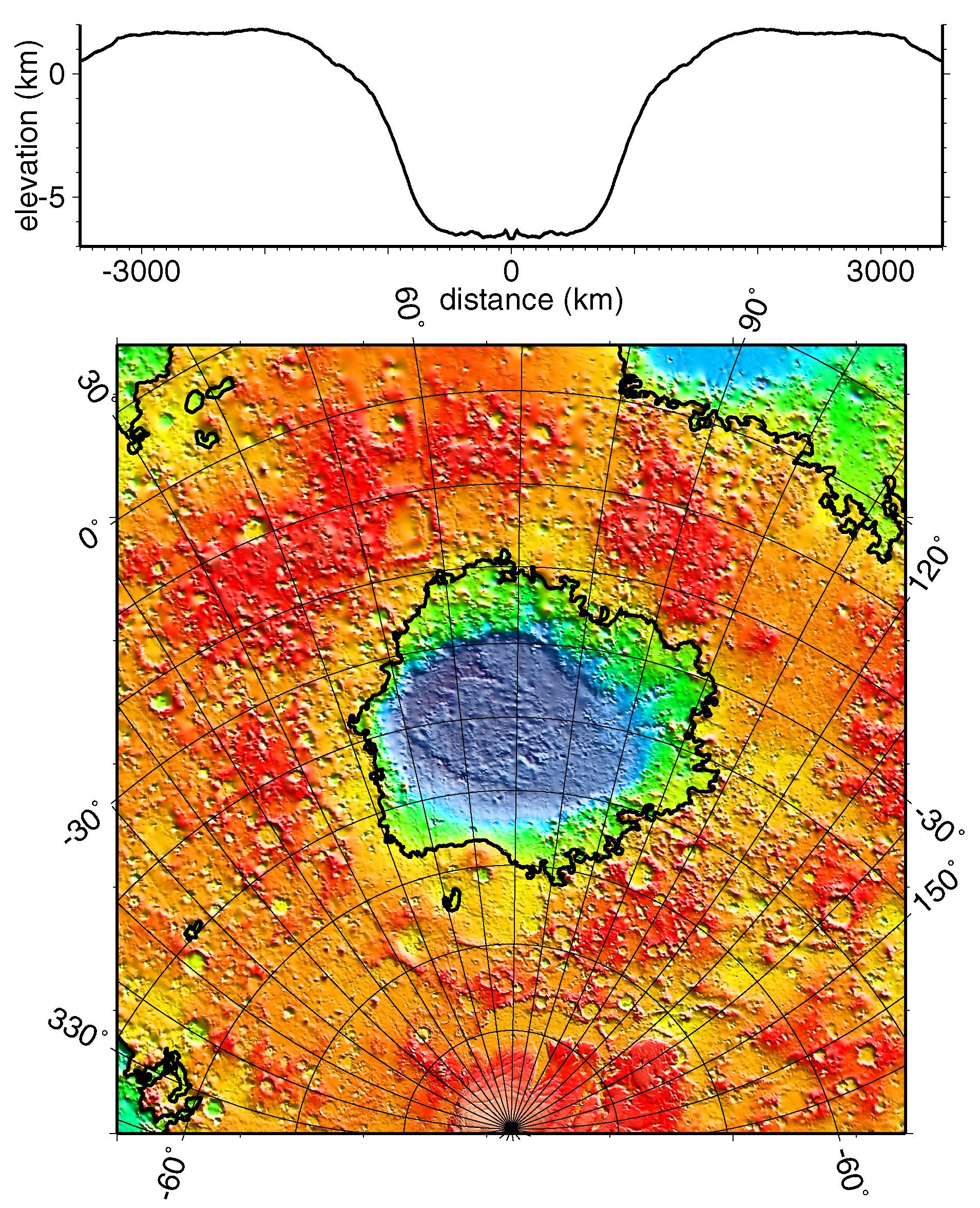
This elevation map shows the surrounding elevated ring of ejecta

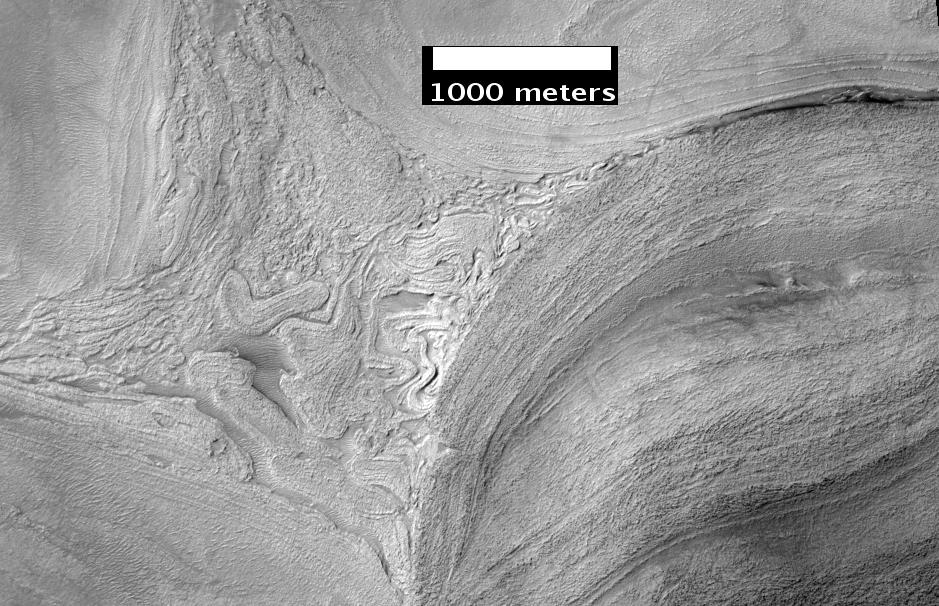
Apparent viscous flow features on the floor of Hellas, as seen by HiRISE.

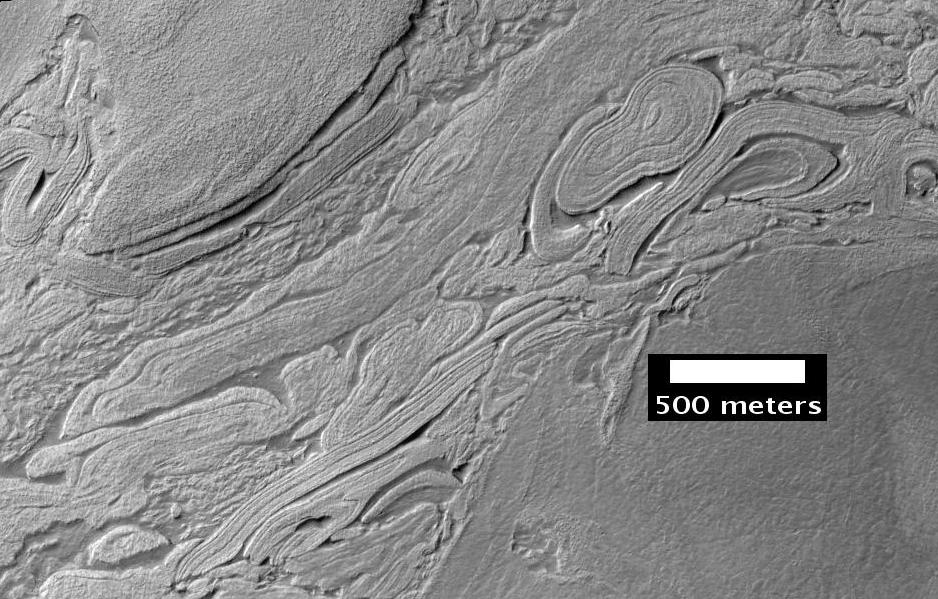
Twisted terrain in Hellas Planitia (actually located in Noachis quadrangle).

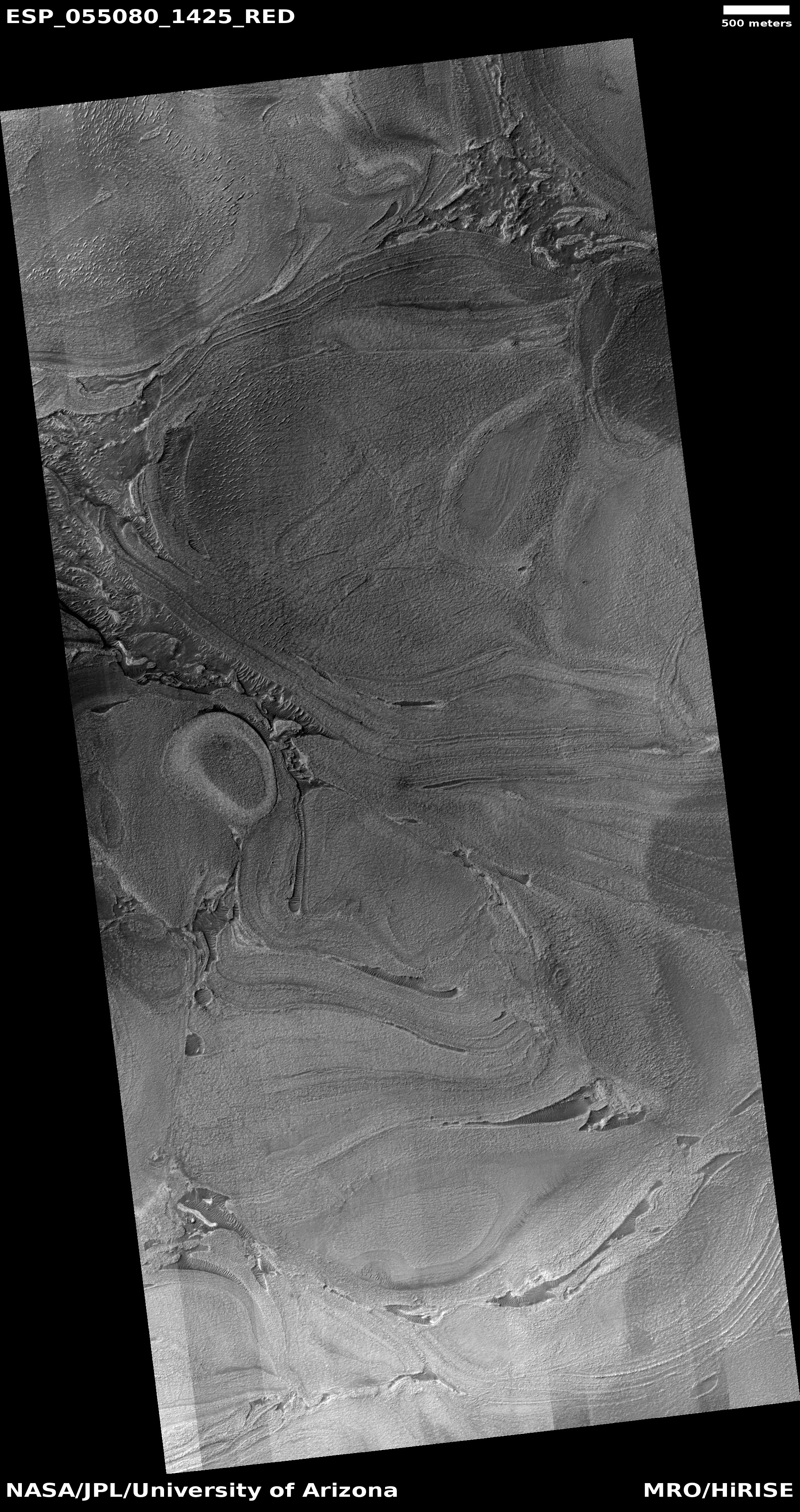
Twisted bands on the floor of Hellas Planitia, as seen by HiRISE under HiWish program

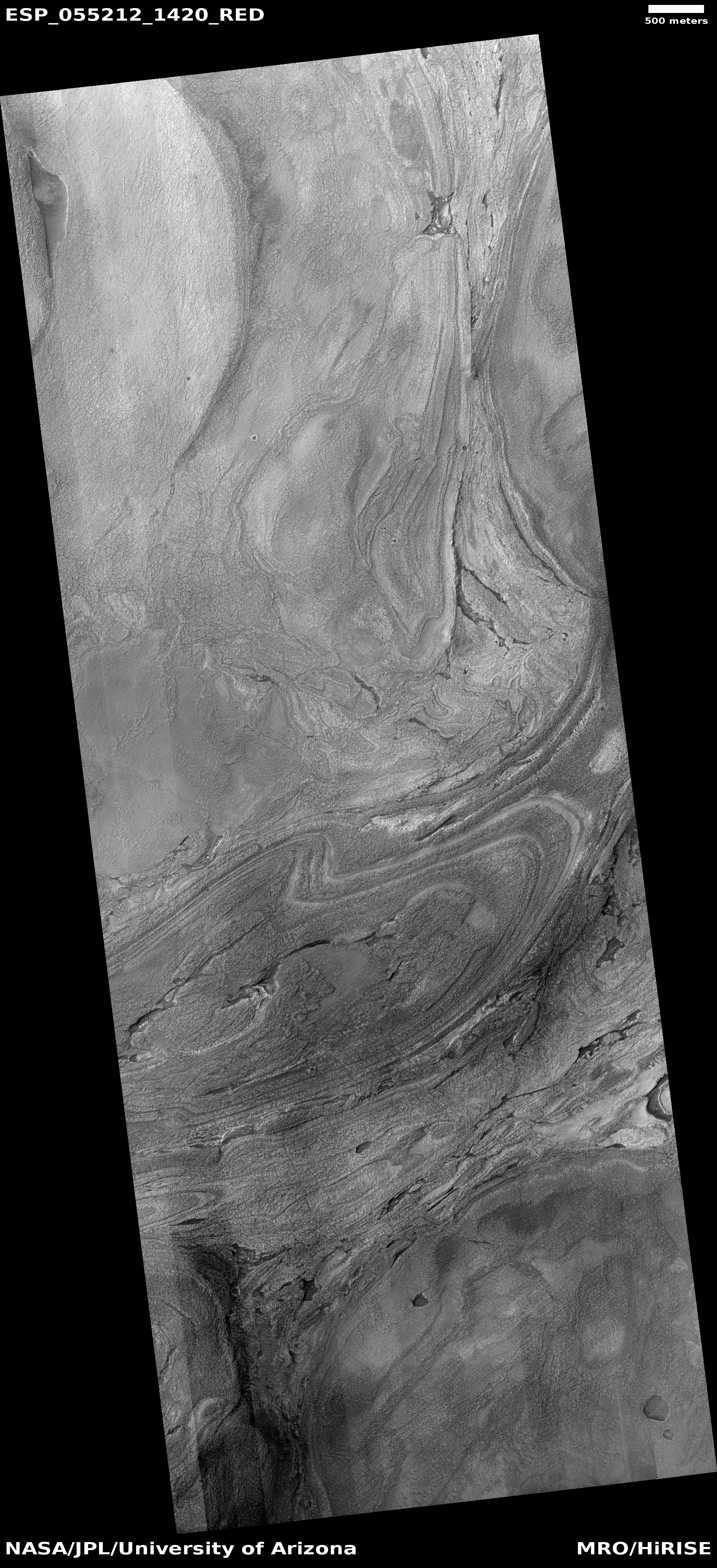
Twisted bands on the floor of Hellas Planitia, as seen by HiRISE under HiWish program These twisted bands are also called "taffy pull" terrain.

== Discovery and naming ==
Due to its size and its light coloring, which contrasts with the rest of the planet, Hellas Planitia was one of the first Martian features discovered from Earth by telescope. Before Giovanni Schiaparelli gave it the name Hellas (which in Greek means Greece), it was known as Lockyer Land, having been named by Richard Proctor in 1867 in honor of Sir Joseph Lockyer, an English astronomer who, using a 16 cm (6.3 in) refractor, produced "the first really truthful representation of the planet" (in the estimation of E. M. Antoniadi).

== Possible glaciers ==
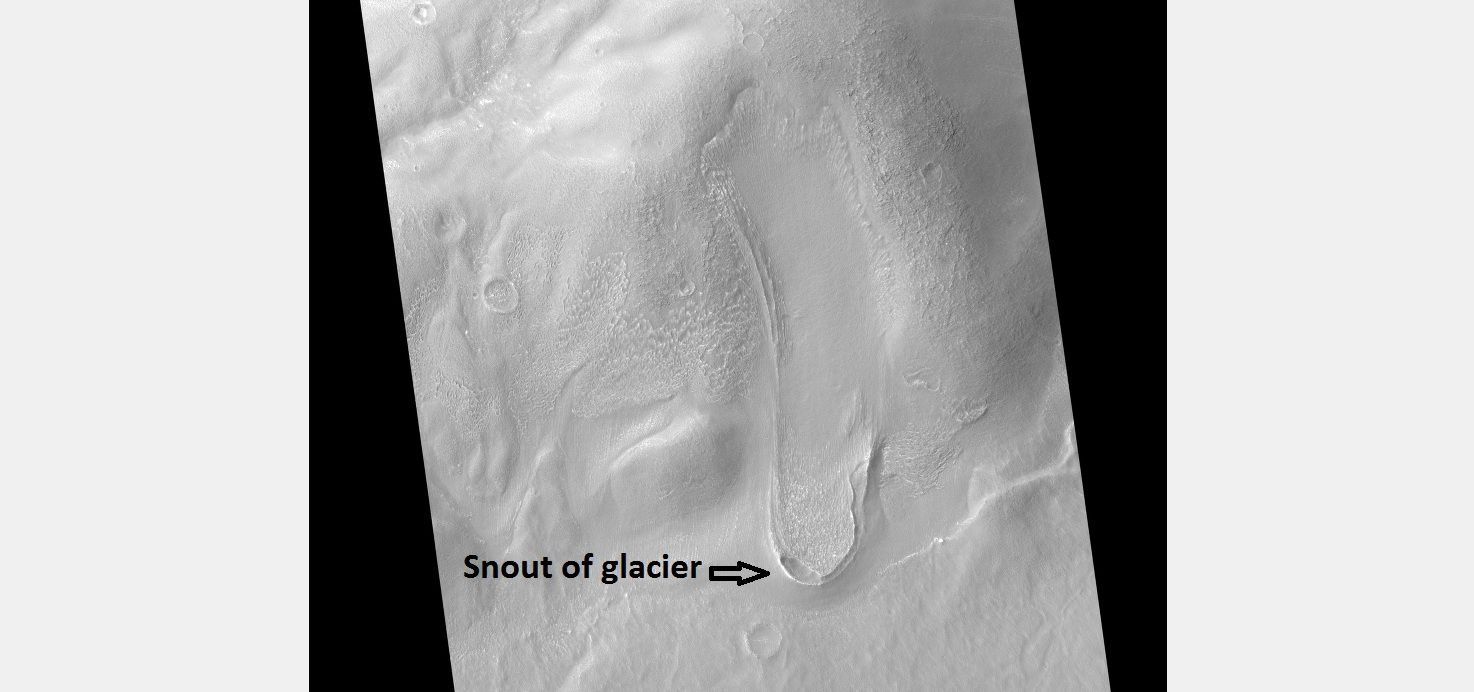
Tongue-shaped glacier in Hellas Planitia. Ice may still exist there beneath an insulating layer of soil.

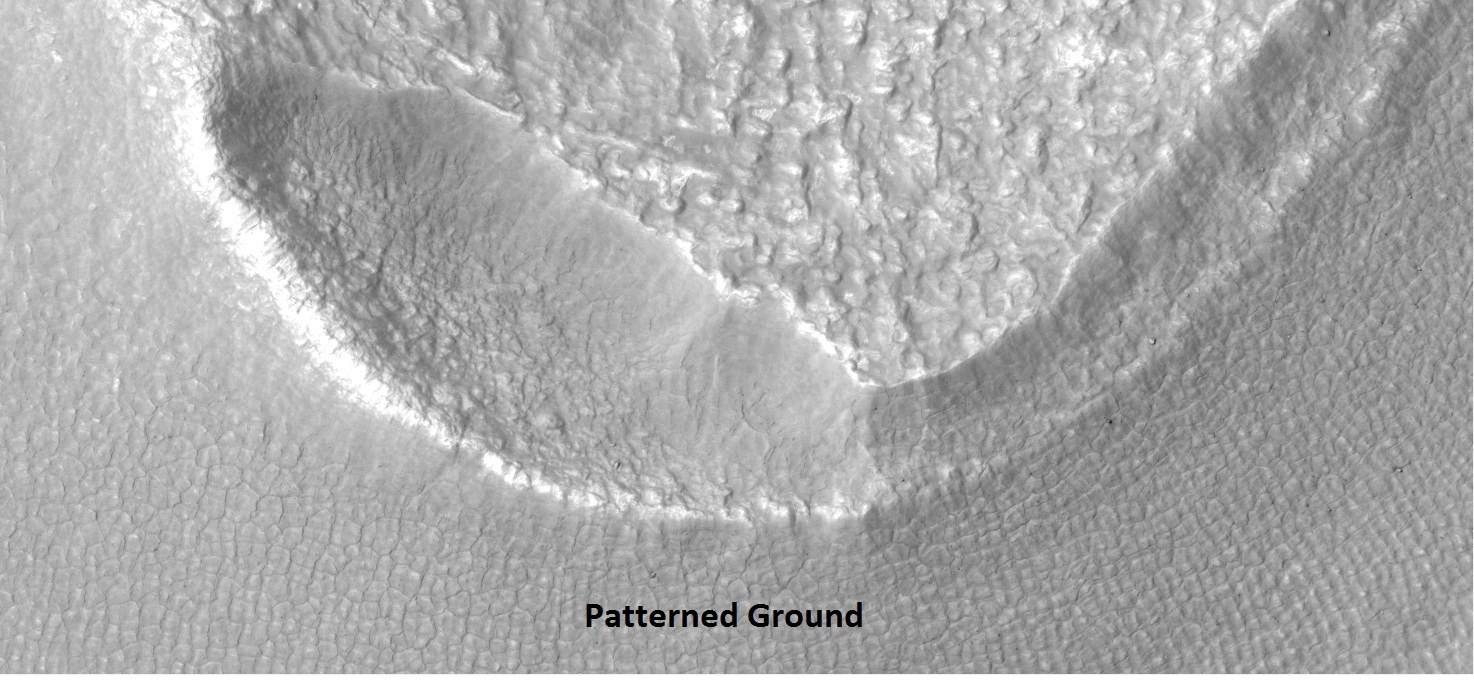
Close-up of glacier with a resolution of about 1 meter. The patterned ground is believed to be caused by the presence of ice.

Radar images by the Mars Reconnaissance Orbiter (MRO) spacecraft's SHARAD radar sounder suggest that features called lobate debris aprons in three craters in the eastern region of Hellas Planitia are actually glaciers of water ice lying buried beneath layers of dirt and rock. The buried ice in these craters as measured by SHARAD is about 250 m (820 ft) thick on the upper crater and about 300 m (980 ft) and 450 m (1,480 ft) on the middle and lower levels respectively. Scientists believe that snow and ice accumulated on higher topography, flowed downhill, and is now protected from sublimation by a layer of rock debris and dust. Furrows and ridges on the surface were caused by deforming ice.

The shapes of many features in Hellas Planitia and other parts of Mars are strongly suggestive of glaciers, as the surface looks as if movement has taken place. Advances in orbital and climatic modelling have supported earlier arguments that viscous flow features present in the mid-latitudes of Mars like Hellas Planitia are related to geologically recent ice ages.

Select analysis of landforms in eastern Hellas Planitia suggests that the detected ice deposits are remnants of a complex history of glaciation and that the region has undergone at least two and possibly three, phases of glaciation. The presence of multiple overlapping glacial units indicates episodes of ice accumulation and flow, interrupted by periods of stagnation and burial under debris. Evidence recorded in the lobate debris aprons suggests that the region underwent a wider glacial period, while analysis of several glacier-like forms with several distinct structures indicative of flow and transportation of mass down-slope suggest additional subsequent more localised glaciation.

== Honeycomb terrain ==
These relatively flat-lying "cells" appear to have concentric layers or bands, similar to a honeycomb. This honeycomb terrain was first discovered in the northwestern part of Hellas. The geologic process responsible for creating these features remains unresolved. Some calculations indicate that this formation may have been caused by ice moving up through the ground in this region. The ice layer would have been between 100 m and 1 km thick. When one substance moves up through another denser substance, it is called a diapir. So, it seems that large masses of ice have pushed up layers of rock into domes that were subsequently eroded. After erosion removed the top of the layered domes, circular features remained.

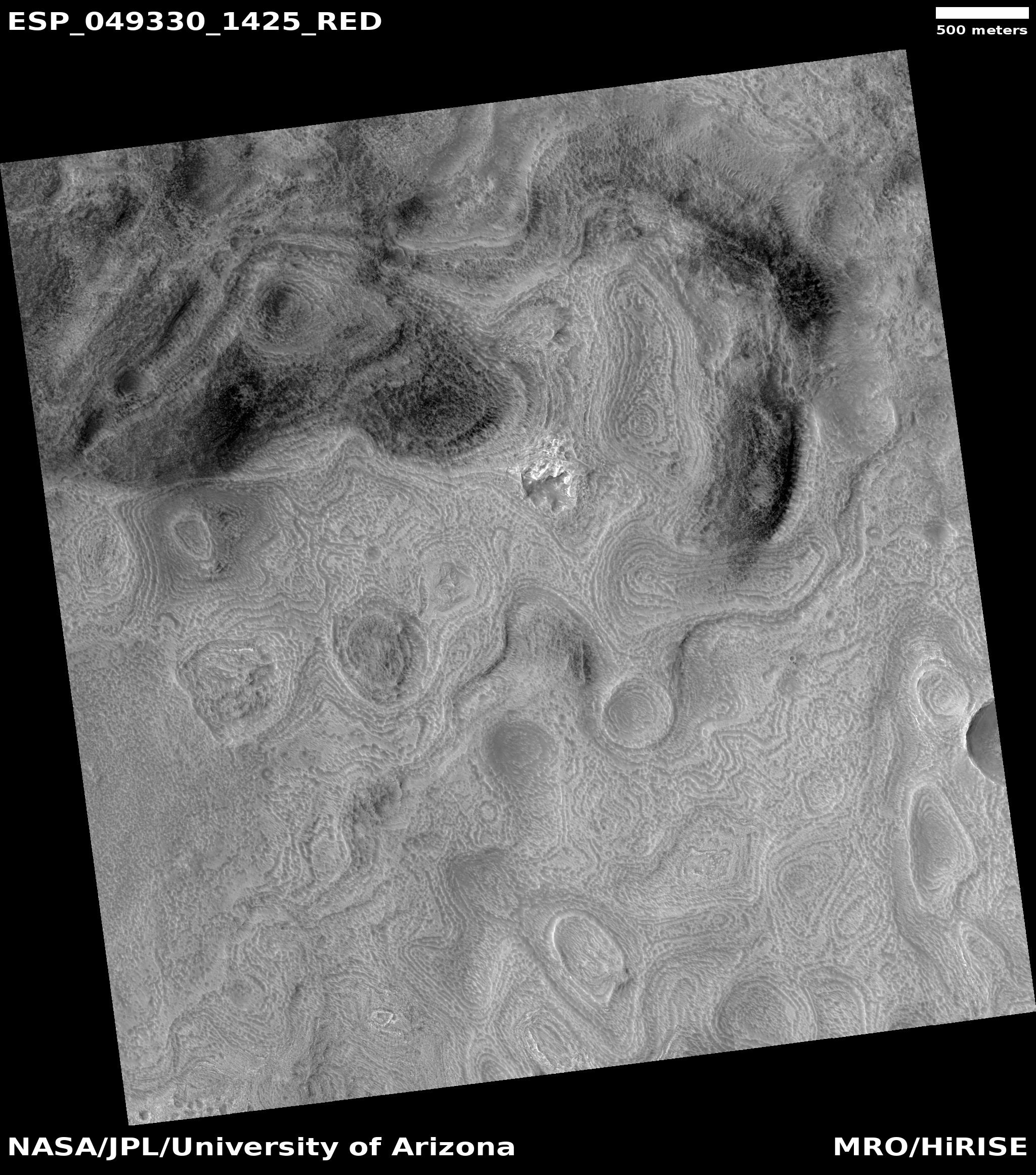
Honeycomb terrain, as seen by HiRISE under HiWish program

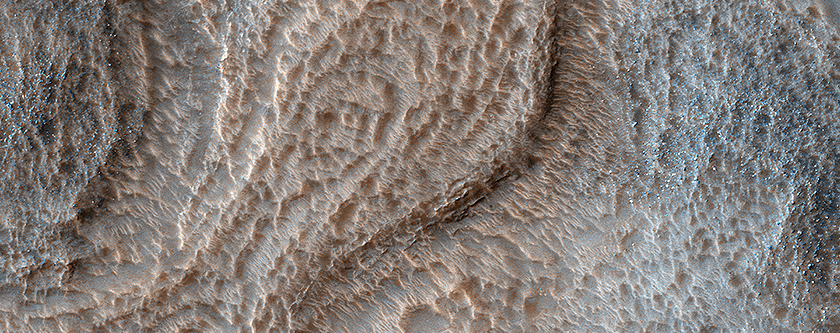
Close, color view of honeycomb terrain, as seen by HiRISE under HiWish program

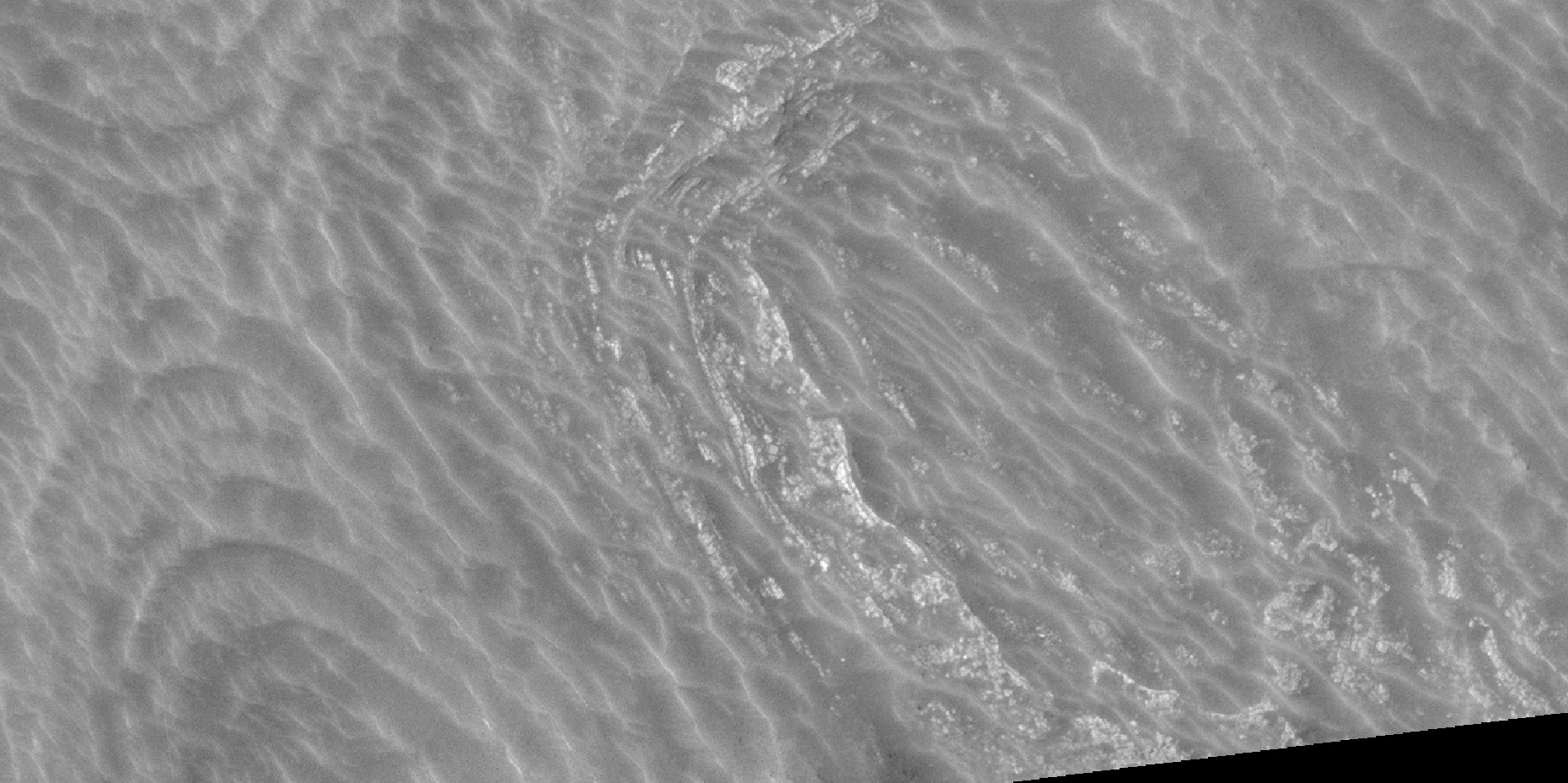
Close view of honeycomb terrain, as seen by HiRISE under HiWish program

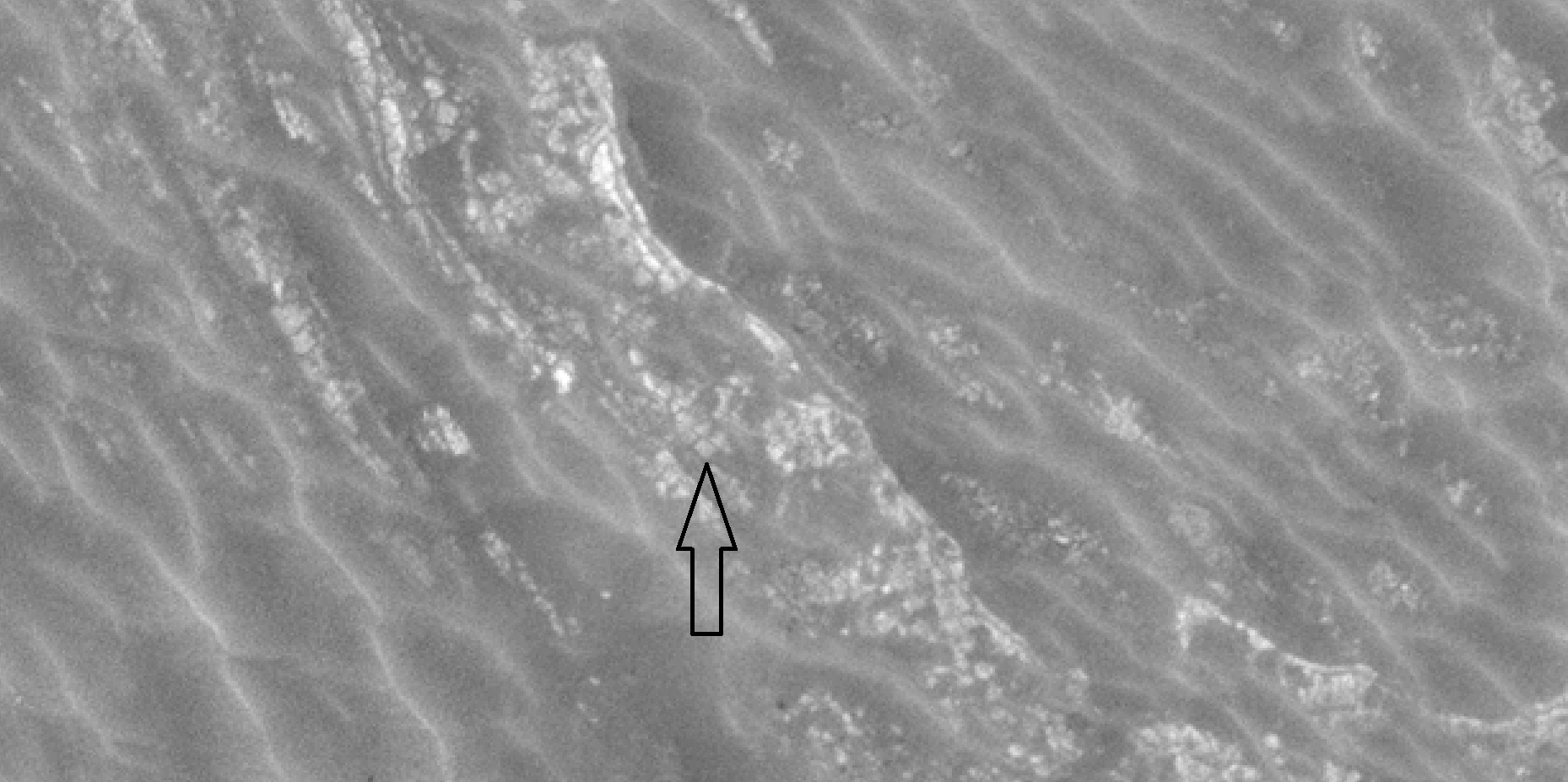
Close view of honeycomb terrain, as seen by HiRISE under HiWish program This enlargement shows material breaking up into blocks. Arrow indicates a cube-shaped block.
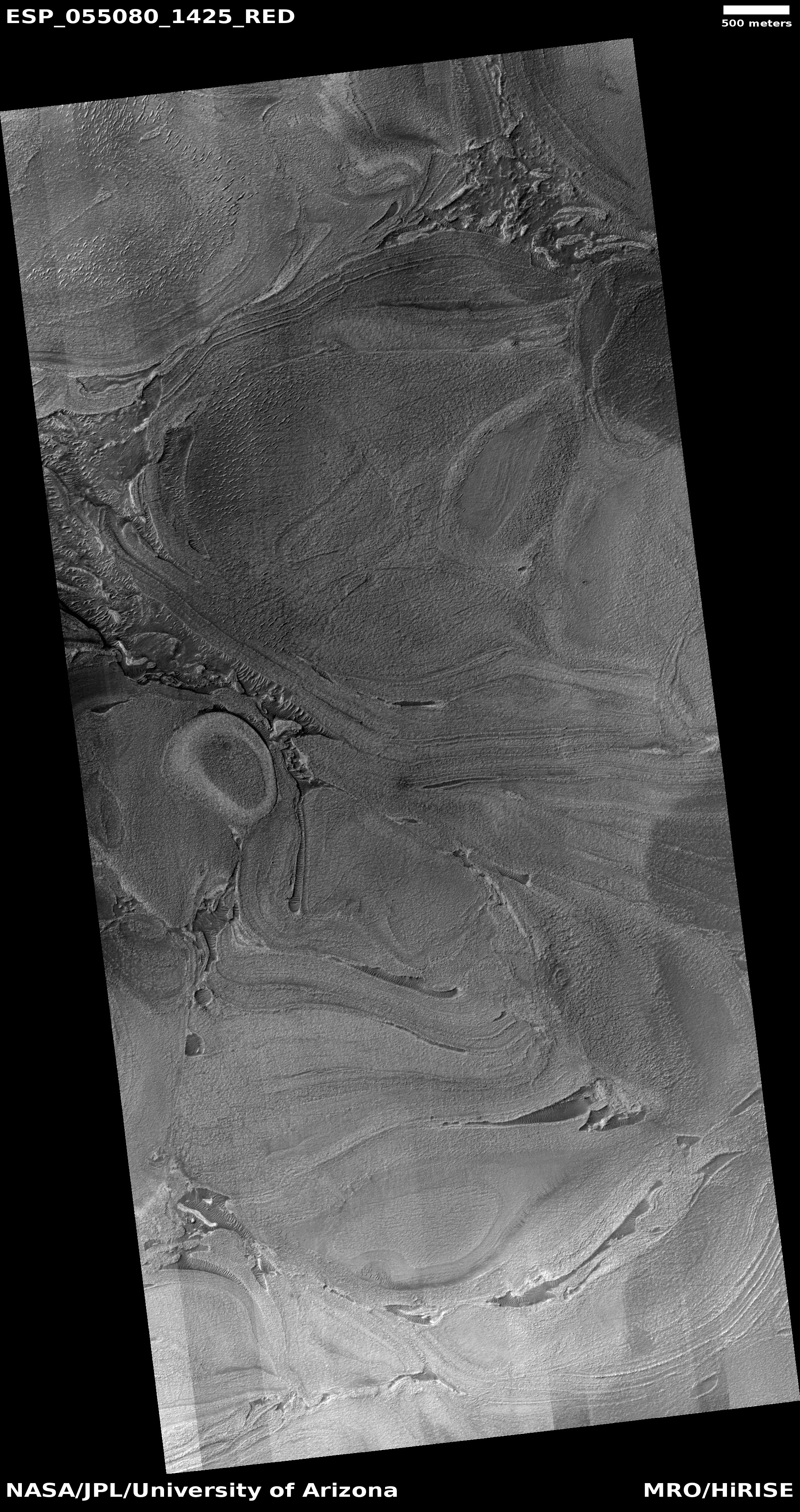
Twisted bands on the floor of Hellas Planitia, as seen by HiRISE under HiWish program

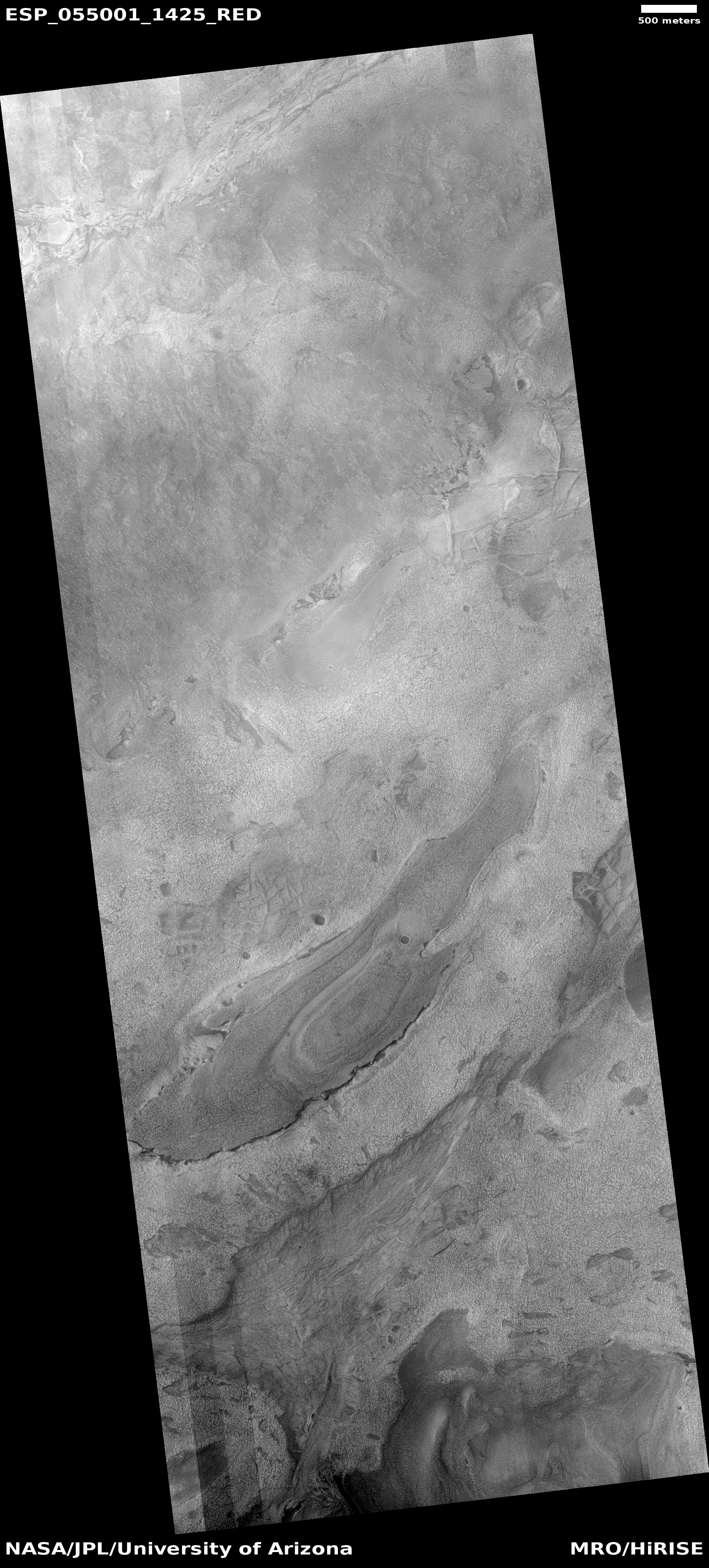
Floor features in Hellas Planitia, as seen by HiRISE under HiWish program

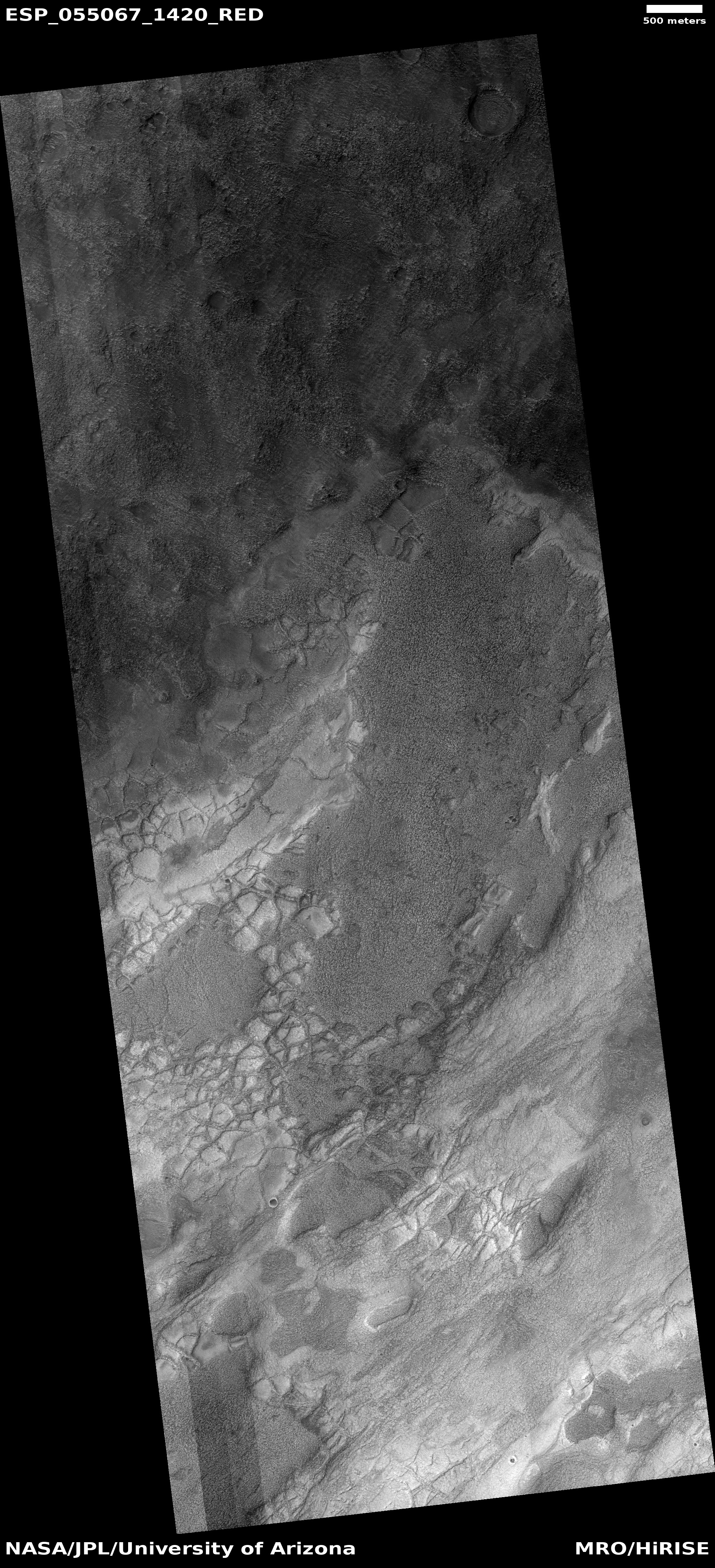
Floor features in Hellas Planitia, as seen by HiRISE under HiWish program

== Layers ==
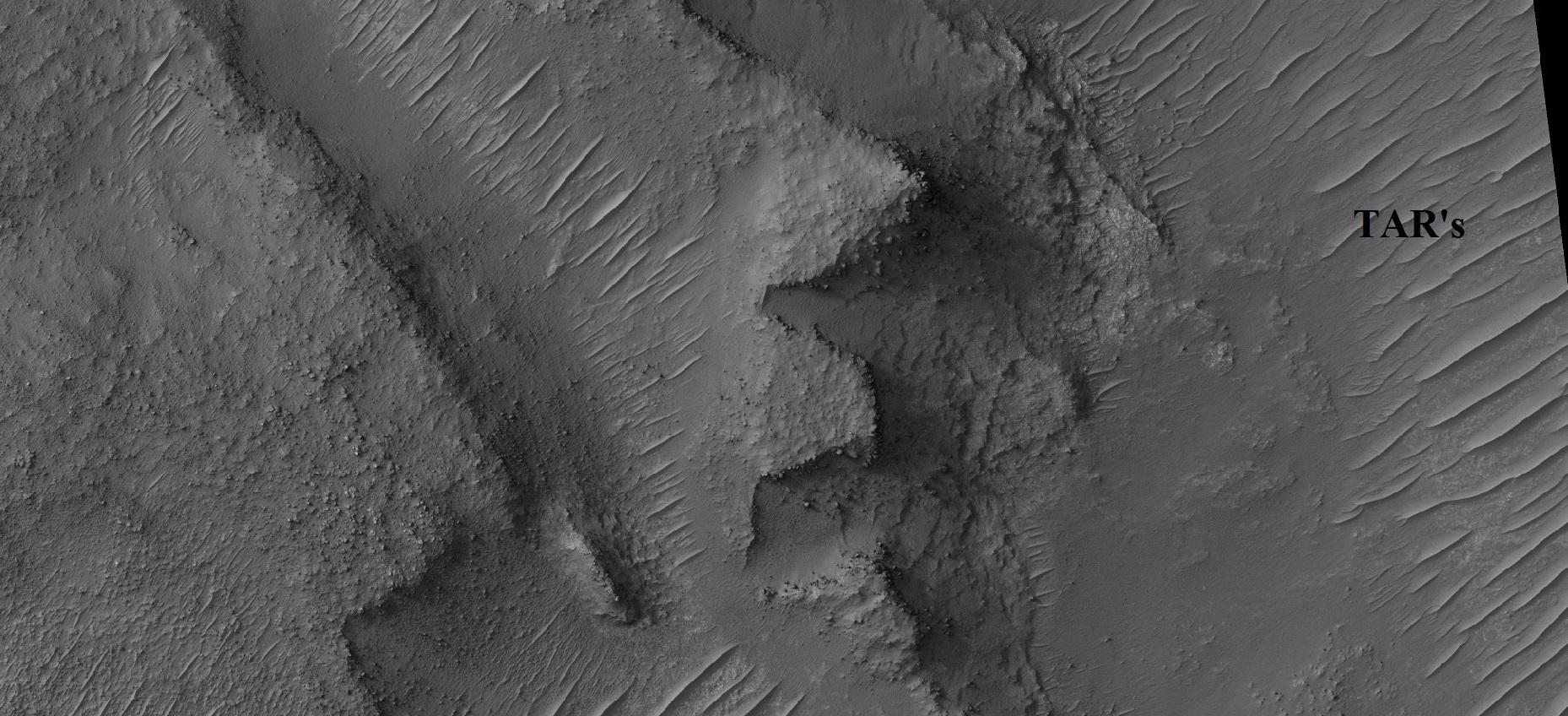
Layers in depression in crater, as seen by HiRISE under HiWish program A special type of sand ripple called Transverse aeolian ridges, TAR's are visible and labeled

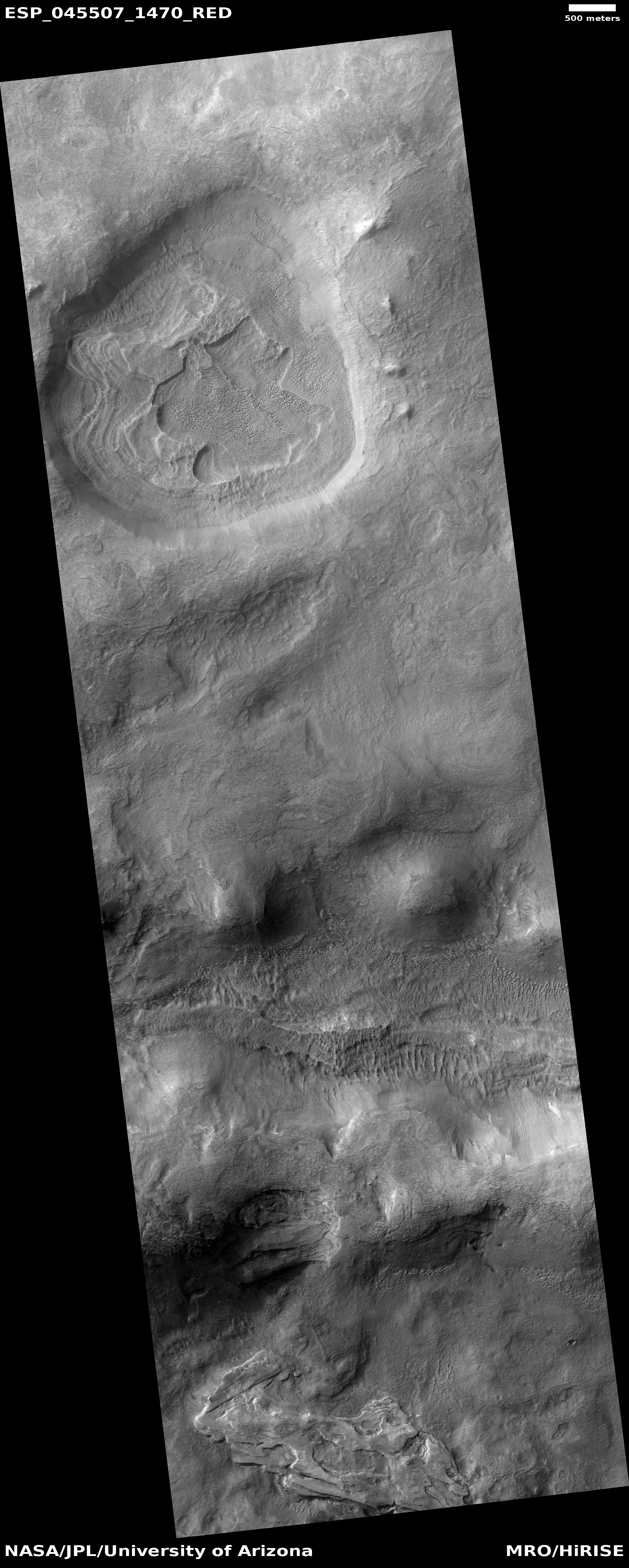
Wide view of layers, as seen by HiRISE under HiWish program

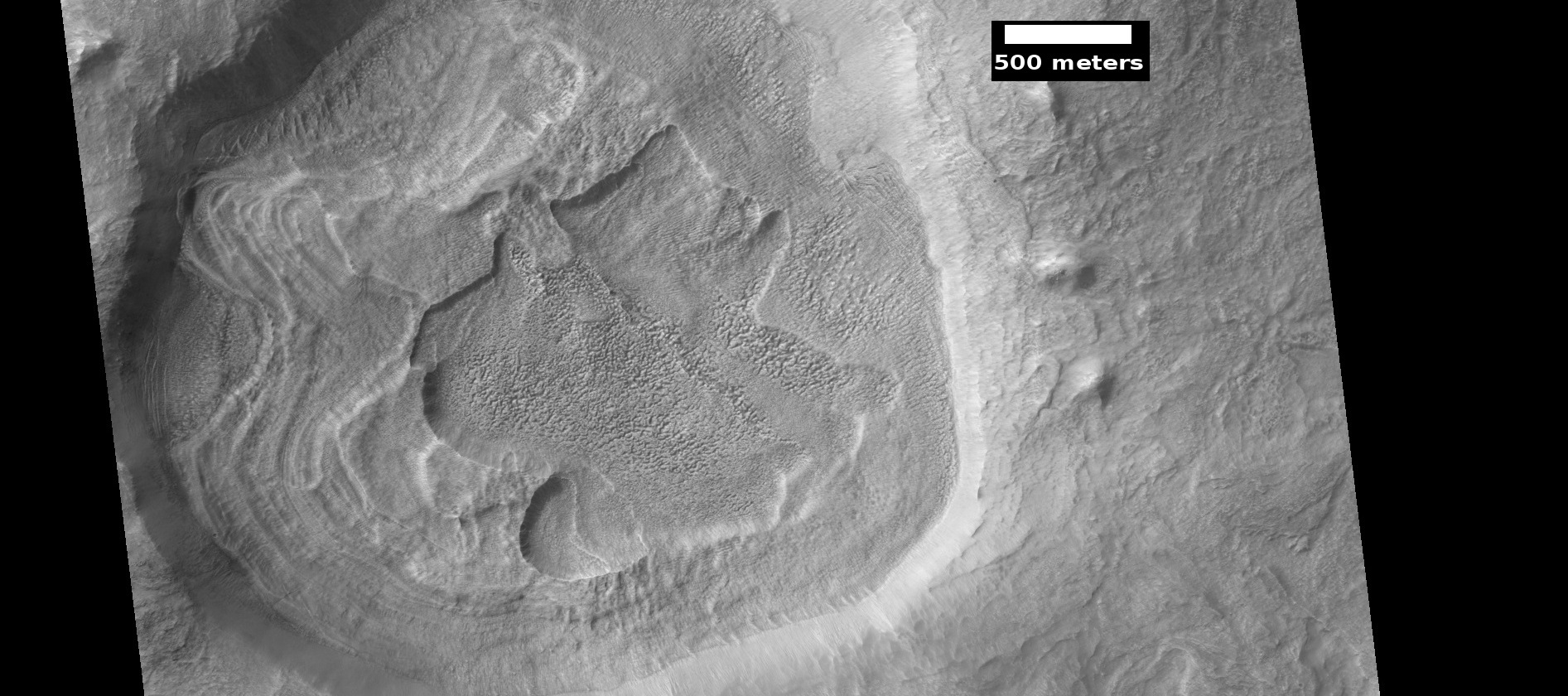
Close view of layered deposit in crater, as seen by HiRISE under HiWish program

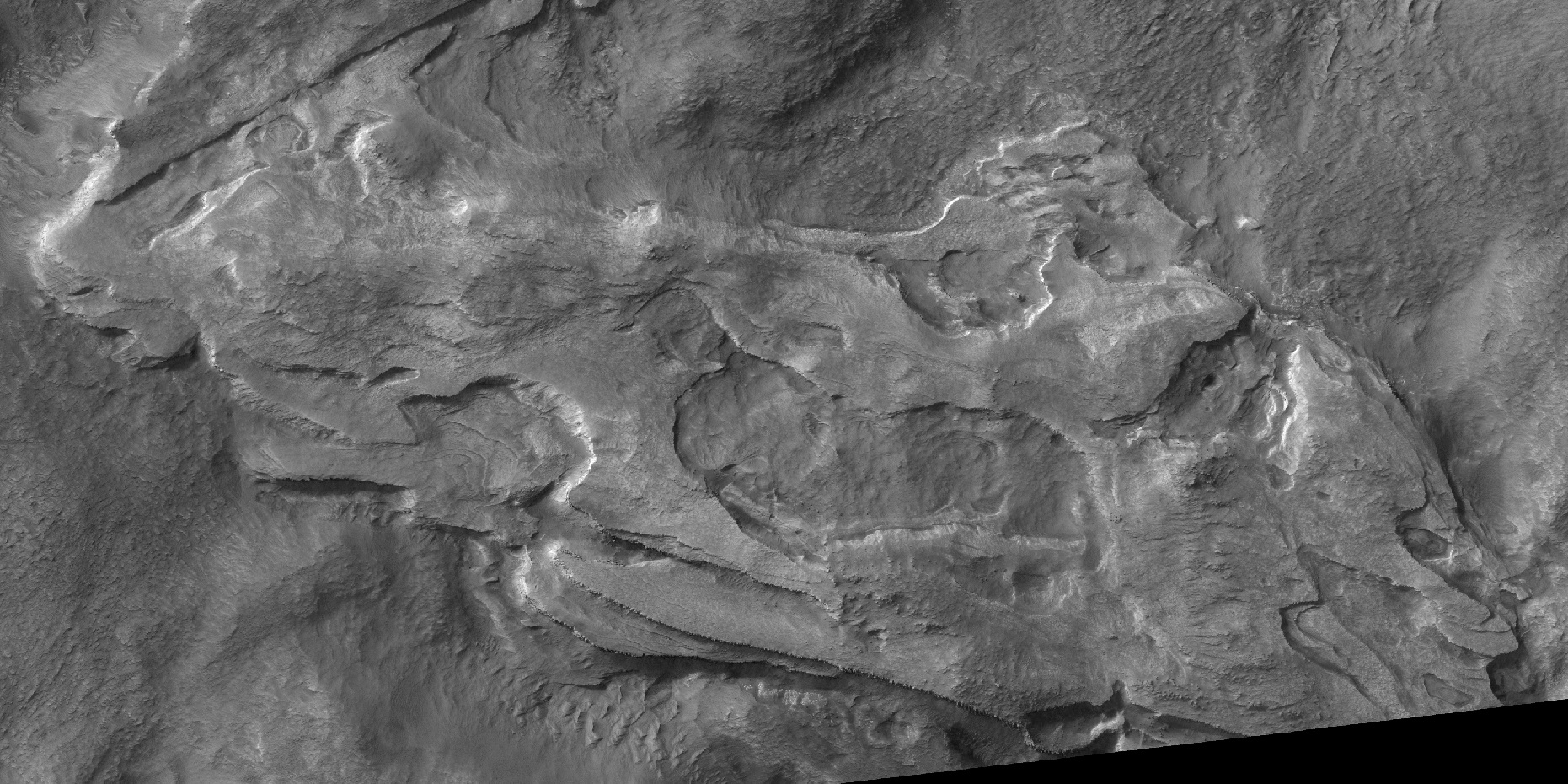
Layered formation, as seen by HiRISE under HiWish program

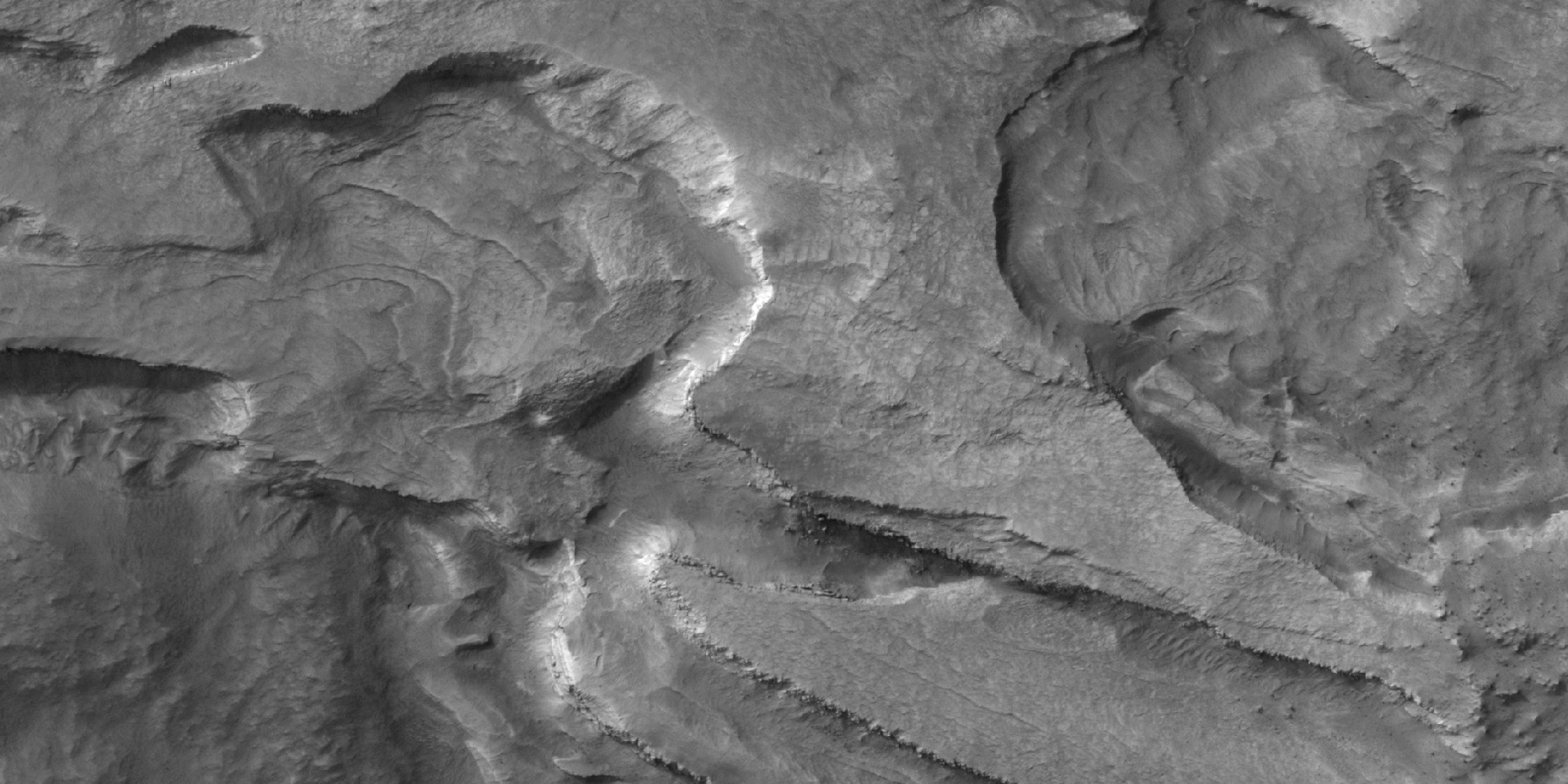
Close view of layers from previous image, as seen by HiRISE under HiWish program

== In popular culture ==
- Hellas Basin was a primary location in the 2017 video game Destiny 2. The location is part of the second game's Warmind downloadable content.
- Hellas is one of the missions of Mars in the 2013 video game Warframe, as well as Olympus.
- It is also featured as a main location in the 2016 Bethesda video game reboot Doom.
- In Planet-Size X-Men #1, the X-Men terraform Mars, turning the basin into Lake Hellas and building the Lake Hellas Diplomatic Ring, where galactic ambassadors can meet within the Sol system.

== See also ==
- Argyre Planitia
- Atmosphere of Mars e.g. pressure at floor of Hellas Planitia
- Dune
- Gale crater
- Geography of Mars
- Glaciers on Mars
- Groundwater on Mars
- List of plains on Mars
- Water on Mars
