= Badwater Crater =

Lowest point on Mars

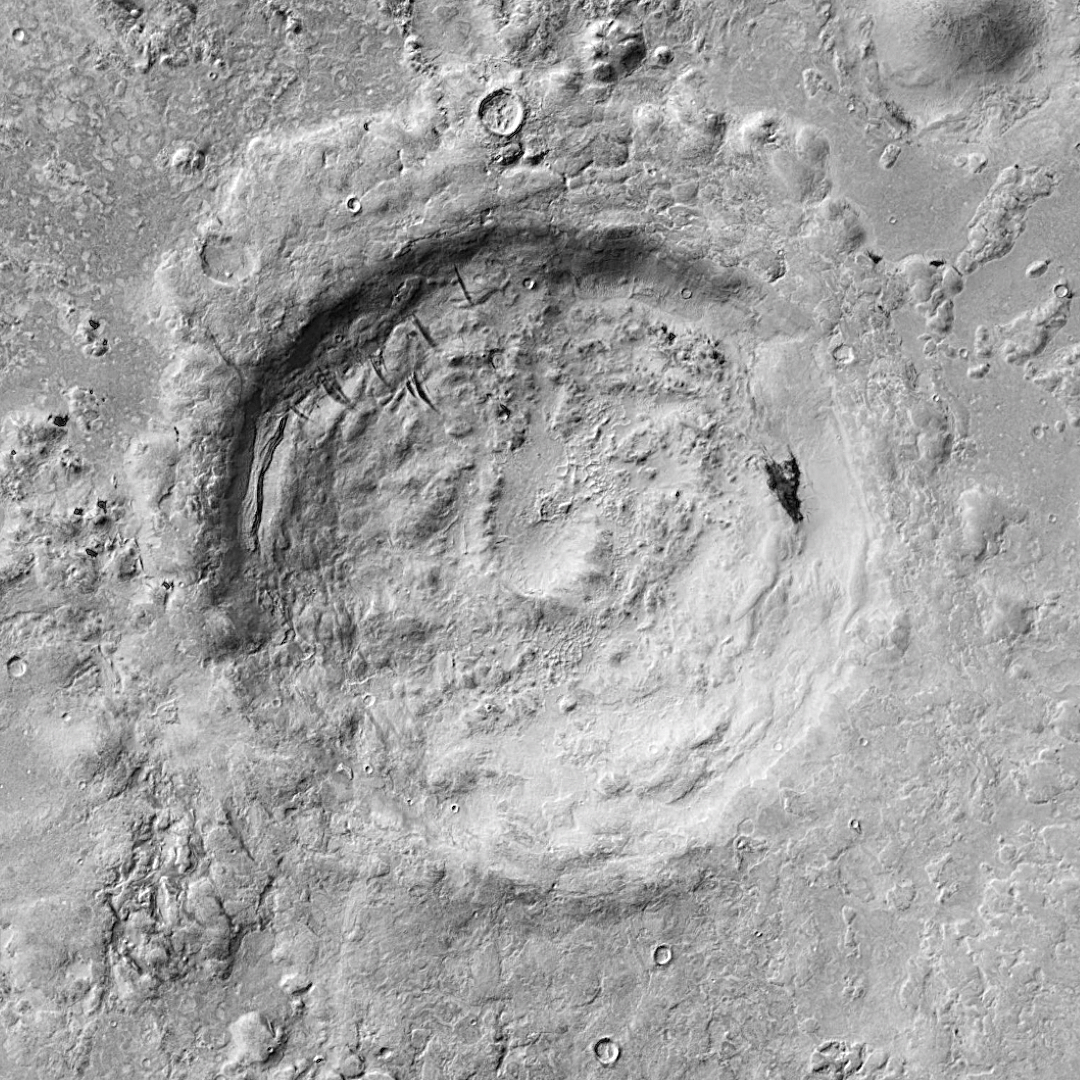
- Badwater Crater, HiRISE CTX greyscale image
- Planet: Mars
- Coordinates: 32.79°S 62.14°E
- Quadrangle: Hellas quadrangle (MC-28)
- Diameter: 33.14 km (20.59 mi)
- Depth: 8,200 m (26,900 ft)

Badwater Crater is an impact crater located in Hellas Planitia and is situated within the low lying Plain of Peneus Palus on the southern hemisphere of Mars. As of 2026, Badwater contains the point of lowest known elevation on the planet, with an elevation of approximately −8,200 metres (−26,900 ft) at 32.79° S, 62.14° E. Badwater has a diameter of approximately 33.14 kilometres (20.59 mi).

Badwater is a particularly interesting geological feature on Mars, not only because of its depth but also because it may be one of the only places on the entire planet where seasonal flows of possible liquid water solutions of brine can exist near or potentially on its surface without being immediately vaporised. This has been observed at various sites as dark streaks of what seems to be some type of hydrated salts discovered by the Mars Reconnaissance Orbiter and the HiRISE camera on board the MRO from NASA.

This could be potentially explained by the warmer months of the year in Mars's orbit on its equatorial plane being heated from the melting of the frozen carbon dioxide on its polar ice caps. This allows the atmosphere to temporarily become thicker than its average 610 pascals (0.088 psi) to a much greater atmospheric pressure of 1,250 pascals (0.181 psi) due to the atmosphere of Mars stacking upon itself from the immense depth of the Hellas impact basin. This leads to an atmospheric pressure of approximately 1.5% that of the Earth.

== Name ==
Badwater Crater is named after Badwater, California in Badwater Basin, the lowest point in North America. The name for the crater was officially adopted by the IAU on the 11 April 2015.

The crater was named in reference to possible water at the site being of a very high salinity.
