= Crater, California =

Unincorporated community in California, United States

Crater
- Former mine
- Location in California Crater (the United States)
- Coordinates: 37°12′58″N 117°41′14″W
- Country: United States
- State: California
- County: Inyo
- Elevation: 5,305 ft (1,617 m)

Crater is a ghost town in Inyo County, California, United States. It is located in the Last Chance Range, 19 miles (31 km) northwest of Ubehebe Crater, at an elevation of 5305 feet (1617 m).

Human activity at the site was primarily concerned with production of sulfur, which was discovered in 1917. Sulfur mining and ore milling operations occurred at Crater intermittently from 1917 through the late 1960s, with a population that peaked at 36. The buildings of the town have been torn down, but the mining equipment remains. The site is a privately owned inholding surrounded by Death Valley National Park.
