= Badwater Basin =

Place in Death Valley National Park, US

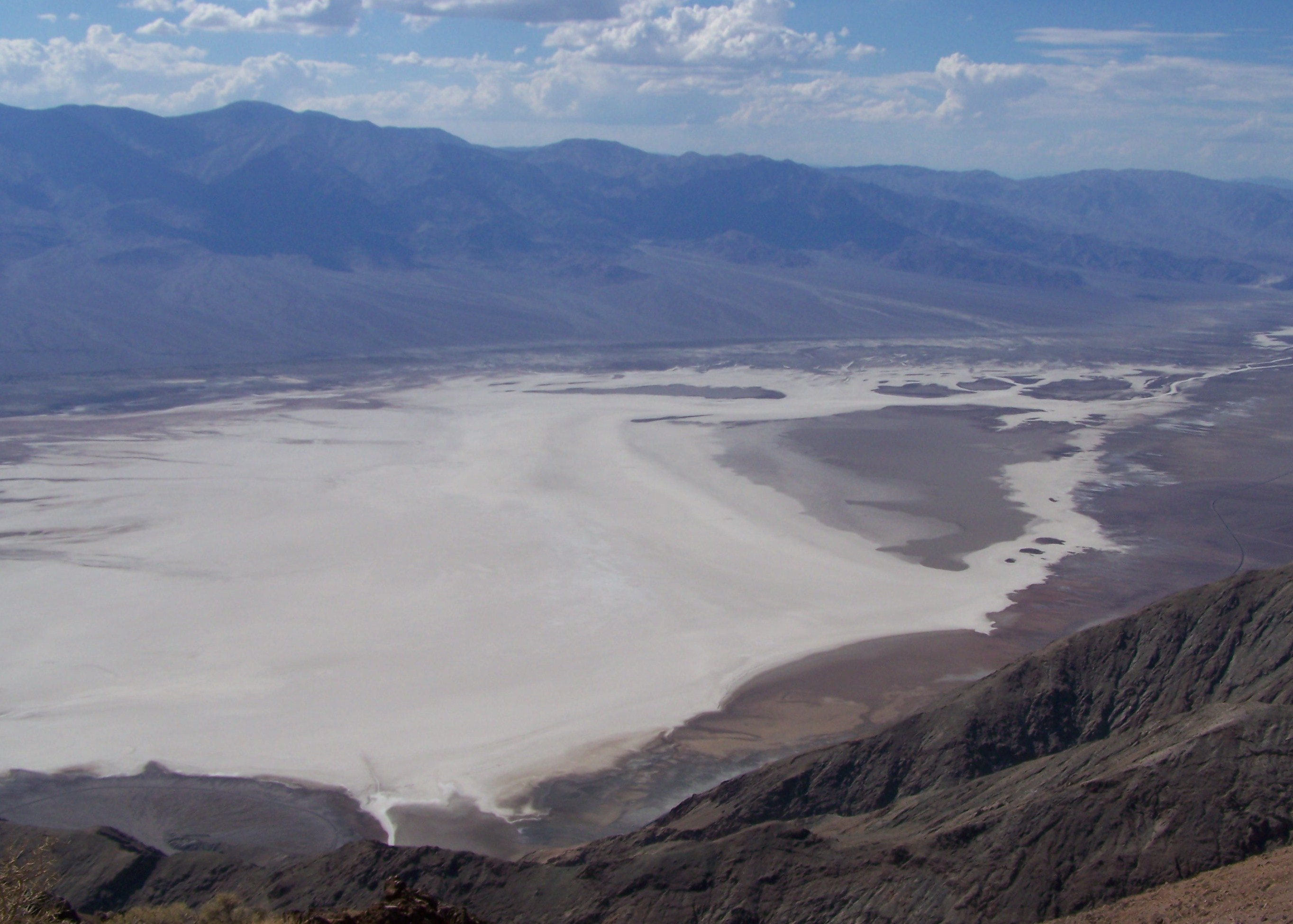
- View of Badwater Basin from Dante's View

- Location within California
- Location: Death Valley; Inyo County, California
- Coordinates: 36°15′01″N 116°49′33″W
- Type: Endorheic basin
- Primary inflows: Amargosa River
- Primary outflows: Terminal (evaporation)
- Basin countries: United States
- Max. length: 7.5 miles (12 km)
- Max. width: 5.0 miles (8 km)
- Surface elevation: −282 ft (−86 m)
- Settlements: Badwater, California
- References: U.S. Geological Survey Geographic Names Information System: Badwater Basin

Badwater Basin is an endorheic basin in Death Valley National Park, Death Valley, Inyo County, California, United States, noted as the lowest point in North America and the United States, with a depth of 282 ft (86 m) below sea level.

The site itself consists of a small spring-fed pool of "bad water" next to the road in a sink; the accumulated salts of the surrounding basin make it non-potable, thus giving it the name. The pool does have animal and plant life, including pickleweed, aquatic insects, and the Badwater snail.

Adjacent to the pool, where water is not always present at the surface, repeated freeze–thaw and evaporation cycles gradually push the thin salt crust into hexagonal shapes.

The pool is not the lowest point of the basin: the lowest point (which is only slightly lower) is several miles to the west and varies in position, depending on rainfall and evaporation patterns. The salt flats are hazardous to traverse (in many cases being only a thin white crust over mud), and so the sign marking the low point is at the pool instead. Despite Laguna del Carbón in Argentina having an elevation of −105 meters (−344 feet), Badwater Basin is often mistakenly described as the lowest elevation in the Western Hemisphere.

Badwater Crater, the lowest place on the planet Mars, is named after the basin due to their similarities.

== Geography ==
At Badwater Basin, significant rainstorms flood the valley bottom periodically, covering the salt pan with a thin sheet of standing water, forming a temporary lake known as Lake Manly. Newly formed lakes do not last long though, because the 1.9 in (48 mm) of average rainfall is overwhelmed by a 150 in (3,800 mm) annual evaporation rate and usually lakes are only a couple inches deep. This is the greatest evaporation potential in the United States, meaning that a 12 ft (3.8 m) lake could dry up in a single year. When the basin is flooded, some of the salt is dissolved; it is redeposited as clean crystals when the water evaporates.

A popular site for tourists is the sign marking "sea level" on the cliff above the Badwater Basin. Similar to Owens Lake, it is characterized by a deep bed of unconsolidated valley fill from which the salt crust emerges.

== History ==
The current best understanding of the area's geological history is that the entire region between the Colorado River in the east and Baja California in the southwest (and bordered by various uplifts and mountains around the west-northwest-northern perimeters) has seen numerous cycles since at least the start of the Pleistocene (and perhaps up to 3 Ma). In these cycles, pluvial lakes of varying size have come and gone in a complex cycle, mainly tied to changing climate patterns (particularly, glaciation during the numerous recent Ice Age cycles), but also influenced by the progressive depositing of alluvial plains and deltas by the Colorado River, as can also be seen in the case of the Salton Sea. These alternate with periodic water body breakthroughs and rearrangements due to erosion and the proximity of the San Andreas Fault. This process has resulted in a high number of evaporating and reforming endorheic lakes throughout the Quaternary Period in the area, with an intertwined history of various larger bodies of water subsuming smaller ones during water table maxima and the subsequent splitting and disappearance thereof during the evaporative part of the cycles. Although these local cycles are now somewhat modified by human presence, their legacy persists; despite appearances much to the contrary, Death Valley actually sits atop one of the largest aquifers in the world.

Throughout the Quaternary's wetter spans, streams running from nearby mountains filled Death Valley, creating Lake Manly, which during its greatest extents was approximately 80 mi (130 km) long and up to 600 ft (180 m) deep. Numerous evaporation cycles and a lack of outflow caused an increasing hypersalinity, typical for endorheic bodies of water. Over time, this hypersalinization, combined with sporadic rainfall and occasional aquifer intrusion, has resulted in periods of "briny soup", or salty pools, on the lowest parts of Death Valley's floor. Salts (95% table salt – NaCl) began to crystallize, coating the surface with the thick crust, ranging from 3 to 60 in (8 to 152 cm), now observable at the basin floor.

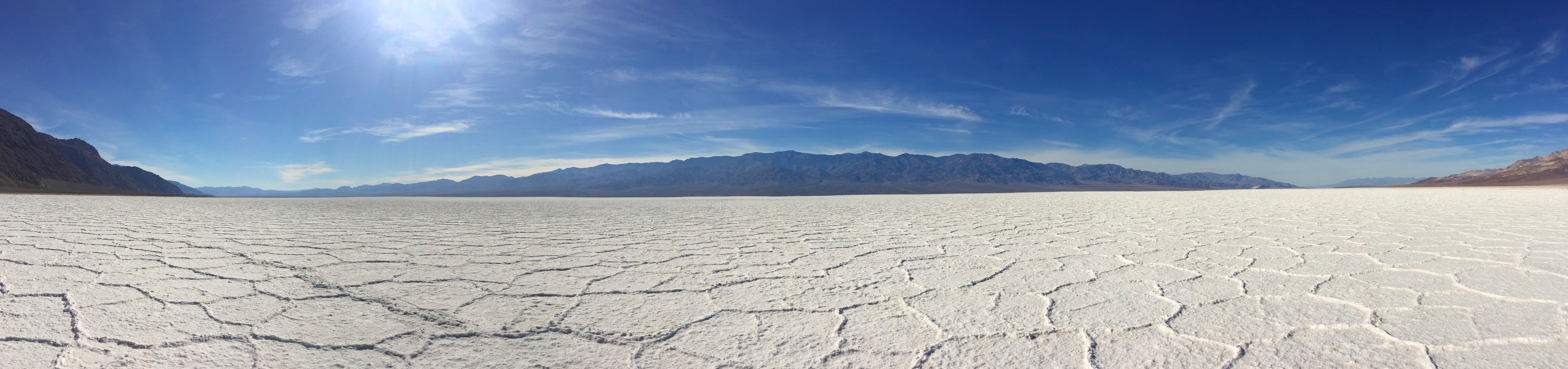
Panoramic view of Badwater Basin

== See also ==
- Badwater Ultramarathon
- Death Valley pupfish
- List of elevation extremes by country
- List of elevation extremes by region
