= Cryptoexplosion =

Type of crater

In geology, a cryptoexplosion structure (or cryptovolcanic structure) is an explosion of unknown cause. The term is now largely obsolete. It was once commonly used to describe sites where there was geological evidence of a large-scale explosion within the Earth's crust, but no definitive evidence for the cause such as normal volcanic rocks. These sites are usually circular with signs of anomalous rock deformation contrasting with the surrounding region, and often showing evidence that crustal material had been uplifted or blown outwards. The assumption was that some unusual form of volcanism, or a gas explosion originating within the crust, was the cause.

The use of the term went away with the rise of the science of impact crater recognition in the late 20th century. Most structures described as cryptoexplosions turned out to be eroded impact craters, caused by the impact of meteorites. Today geologists discount former cryptoexplosion theories.

== See also ==
- Impact structure
- Astrobleme
- Impact event
- Traces of Catastrophe, a 1998 reference book
