= The Crater (novel) =

Novel by James Fenimore Cooper

The Crater, or Vulcan's Peak: a Tale of the Pacific
- Author: James Fenimore Cooper
- Language: English
- Publication date: 1847

The Crater, or Vulcan's Peak: a Tale of the Pacific is a novel by James Fenimore Cooper first published in 1847. Cooper incorporated knowledge of ship construction he had acquired while working as a U.S. Navy midshipman in the 1810s.

From merely surviving the loss of his shipmates and the embayment of his ship within The Reef, protagonist and role-model Mark Woolston goes on to thrive by his own industry. Following a regional volcanic upheaval which raises new land, he founds a similarly industrious and thriving colony after escaping from, then returning to, The Reef. The outnumbered colonists must defend their new homes and possessions against natives who covet the new land. The novel concludes with the apocalyptic annihilation of the island colony by another natural disaster.

== See also ==
- The Coral Island
- Lord of the Flies
