= Crates (comic poet) =

5th-century BC Athenian Old Comedy poet

Crates (Greek: Κράτης) was an Athenian Old Comic poet, who was victorious three times at the City Dionysia, first probably in 450 BC. His career had apparently ended by 424 BC, when Aristophanes portrays him in The Knights as a figure from the past. Before he began writing, he was an actor for Cratinus.

Aristotle claims in the Poetics that Crates was the first comic poet to create complete plots, rather than personal abuse, and his surviving fragments support this. His style of comedy was apparently therefore rather different from that of Aristophanes' more political and topical works, and by the end of the fourth century BC this was the dominant style of comedy. He was also supposedly the first Athenian comic poet to write a drunk character.

Sixty fragments (four uncertain) survive. According to the Suda and an anonymous writer on comedy, he wrote seven plays; another source says eight. Eleven titles are attributed to him:

- Geitones ("Neighbours")
- Eortai ("Feasts")
- Heroes ("Heroes")
- Theria ("Wild Beasts")
- Lamia ("Lamia")
- Metoikoi ("Metics")
- Paidiai ("Games")
- Pedetai ("Men In Chains")
- Rhetores ("Politicians")
- Samioi ("The Samians")
- Tolmai ("Daring Deeds")

Of these titles, Feasts may be a mistake caused by confusion with Plato Comicus's play of that name; the Men in Chains might be a mistake for Games, by confusion with Callias' Men in Chains; and the Politicians, attested in only one fragment, might be a mistake for Heroes or Neighbours. Crates' Metics is attested only in a single fragment preserved in the Etymologicum Genuinum; other plays of that name by Pherecrates and Plato Comicus are attested, and it is unclear whether all three are separate works.

== Works cited ==
- Dover, Kenneth James (2012). "Crates (1)". Oxford Classical Dictionary. Oxford: Oxford University Press.
- Kassel, Rudolf; Austin, Colin, eds. (1983). Poetae Comici Graeci. Vol. IV Aristophon - Crobylus. de Gruyter.
- Nesselrath, Heinz-Günther (2006). "Crates [1]". Brill's New Pauly. doi:10.1163/1574-9347_bnp_e622160.
- Storey, Ian C. (2011). Fragments of Old Comedy. Vol. I: Alcaeus to Diocles. Cambridge Massachusetts: Harvard University Press.
