= Crater Lake (disambiguation) =

Crater Lake is a lake in Klamath County, Oregon, United States.

Crater Lake of crater lake may also refer to:

== Lake types ==
- Impact crater lake, a lake created by a meteor
- Volcanic crater lake, a lake formed by volcanic activity; includes a list of lakes

== Places ==
- Crater Lake (Colorado), a lake in the Elk Mountains
- Crater Lake (Idaho), an alpine lake in Custer County
- Crater Lake (South Shetland Islands), a lake in Deception Island, South Shetland Islands, Antarctica
- Crater Lake, a lake near Cradle Mountain, Tasmania, Australia
- Crater Lake (Te Wai ā-moe), a lake on the summit of Mount Ruapehu, New Zealand

== Other uses ==
- Crater Lake, a 1987 Deathlands novel

== See also ==
- Volcano Lake, a lake on Vancouver Island, British Columbia, Canada
