= Crates (engineer) =

Crates (Greek: Κράτης) or Craterus (Κρατερός) was a mining (μεταλλευτής metalleutes) and hydraulic engineer, who accompanied Alexander the Great. He was entrusted with draining Lake Copais in Boeotia and contributed to the construction of Alexandria. It appears that Crates may have been an Olynthian who settled in the Euboean mother-city, Chalcis, after the destruction of Olynthus in 348 BC.
