= List of Chrysops species =

This is a list of species in the genus Chrysops.

== Chrysops species ==
- Chrysops abaptistus Séguy, 1950
- Chrysops abatus Phillip, 1941
- Chrysops abavius Philip, 1961
- Chrysops aberrans Philip, 1941
- Chrysops additus Oldroyd, 1957
- Chrysops aeneus Pechuman, 1943
- Chrysops aestuans Wulp, 1867
- Chrysops affinis Bellardi, 1859
- Chrysops alajuelensis Burger, 2002
- Chrysops albicinctus Wulp, 1869
- Chrysops alleni Fairchild, 1939
- Chrysops alter Rondani, 1875
- Chrysops altivagus Osten Sacken, 1886
- Chrysops amazon Daecke, 1905
- Chrysops angaricus Olsufiev, 1937
- Chrysops angolensis Dias, 1974
- Chrysops anthrax Olsufiev, 1937
- Chrysops aprugnus Austen, 1912
- Chrysops argentinus Pechuman, 1953
- Chrysops asbestos Philip, 1950
- Chrysops aterOsten Sacken, 1875
- Chrysops atlantica Pechuman, 1949
- Chrysops atra Macquart, 1850
- Chrysops atrivittatus Schuurmans Stekhoven, 1924
- Chrysops auroguttatus Kröber, 1930
- Chrysops austeni Neave, 1915
- Chrysops australis Ricardo, 1915
- Chrysops balzaphire Philip, 1955
- Chrysops basalis Shiraki, 1918
- Chrysops beameri Brennan, 1935
- Chrysops berta Pechuman, 1940
- Chrysops bicolor Cordier, 1907
- Chrysops bifasciatus (Geoffroy, 1785)
- Chrysops bifurcatus Philip, 1979
- Chrysops bimaculosus Neave, 1915
- Chrysops bishoppi Brennan, 1935
- Chrysops bistellatus Daecke, 1905
- Chrysops bivittatus Lutz, 1909
- Chrysops boliviensis Kröber, 1926
- Chrysops bonariensis Brèthes, 1910
- Chrysops brevifascius Lutz, 1909
- Chrysops brimleyi Hine, 1904
- Chrysops brucei Austen, 1907
- Chrysops brunneus Hine, 1903
- Chrysops bulbicornis Lutz, 1911
- Chrysops buxtoni Austen, 1922
- Chrysops caecutiens (Linnaeus, 1758)
- Chrysops calidus Walker, 1848
- Chrysops callidus Osten Sacken, 1875
- Chrysops calogaster Schiner, 1868
- Chrysops calopterus Hine, 1905
- Chrysops calvus Pechuman & Teskey, 1967
- Chrysops canifrons Walker, 1848
- Chrysops carbonarius Walker, 1848
- Chrysops carbonarius var. nubiapex Philip, 1955
- Chrysops centurionis Austen, 1911
- Chrysops cervulus Séguy, 1950
- Chrysops chaharicus Chen & Quo, 1949
- Chrysops chiriquensis Fairchild, 1939
- Chrysops chusanensis Ôuchi, 1939
- Chrysops ciliaris Loew, 1858
- Chrysops cincticornis Walker, 1848
- Chrysops clavicornis Brennan, 1935
- Chrysops coloradensis Bigot, 1892
- Chrysops compactus Austen, 1924
- Chrysops concavus Loew, 1858
- Chrysops connexus Loew, 1858
- Chrysops coquilletti Hine, 1904
- Chrysops costaricensis Burger, 2002
- Chrysops croceus Séguy, 1950
- Chrysops crucians Wiedemann, 1828
- Chrysops cuclux Whitney, 1879
- Chrysops currani Kröber, 1926
- Chrysops cursim Whitney, 1879
- Chrysops dacne Philip, 1955
- Chrysops dampfi Philip, 1955
- Chrysops dawsoni Philip, 1959
- Chrysops decipiens Kröber, 1926
- Chrysops delicatulus Osten Sacken, 1875
- Chrysops deqenensis Yang & Xu, 1995
- Chrysops designatus Ricardo, 1911
- Chrysops dimidiatus Wulp, 1885
- Chrysops dimmocki Hine, 1905
- Chrysops discalis Williston, 1880
- Chrysops dispar (Fabricius, 1798)
- Chrysops dissectus Loew, 1858
- Chrysops dissimilis Brennan, 1935
- Chrysops distinctipennis Austen, 1906
- Chrysops divaricatus Loew, 1858
- Chrysops divisus Walker, 1848
- Chrysops dixianus Pechuman, 1974
- Chrysops dorsovittatus Hine, 1907
- Chrysops dubiens Philip, 1979
- Chrysops ecuadorensis Lutz, 1909
- Chrysops excitans Walker, 1850
- Chrysops facialis Townsend, 1897
- Chrysops fairchildi Philip, 1955
- Chrysops fasciatus Wiedemann, 1821
- Chrysops fascipennis Macquart, 1834
- Chrysops fixissimus Walker, 1856
- Chrysops flavescens (Szilády, 1922)
- Chrysops flavidus Wiedemann, 1821
- Chrysops flavipennis Kröber, 1925
- Chrysops flavipes Meigen, 1804
- Chrysops flaviscutellatus Philip, 1963
- Chrysops flaviventris Macquart, 1846
- Chrysops flavocinctus Ricardo, 1902
- Chrysops flavoscutellatus Kröber, 1926
- Chrysops flinti Coscarón, 1979
- Chrysops formosus Kröber, 1926
- Chrysops frazari Williston, 1887
- Chrysops frigidus Osten Sacken, 1875
- Chrysops frontalis Macquart, 1838
- Chrysops fulvaster Osten Sacken, 1877
- Chrysops fulvistigma Hine, 1904
- Chrysops funebris Austen, 1907
- Chrysops furcatus Walker, 1848
- Chrysops fusciapex Lutz, 1909
- Chrysops fuscipennis Ricardo, 1902
- Chrysops fuscomarginalis Burger & Chainey, 2000
- Chrysops geminatus Wiedemann, 1828
- Chrysops godinhoi Dias, 1966
- Chrysops gracilis Kröber, 1926
- Chrysops grandis (Szilády, 1922)
- Chrysops griseicollis Bequaert, 1930
- Chrysops gutipennis Kröber, 1929
- Chrysops hamatus Loew, 1858
- Chrysops harmani Tidwell, 1973
- Chrysops hinei Daecke, 1907
- Chrysops hirsuticallus Philip, 1941
- Chrysops hubbardi Pringle, 1967
- Chrysops hyalipennis Stackelberg, 1926
- Chrysops idlani Al-Talafha, Yaakop & Idris, 2017
- Chrysops ifasi Fairchild, 1978
- Chrysops incisuralis Philip, 1979
- Chrysops incisus Macquart, 1846
- Chrysops inconspicuus Austen, 1907
- Chrysops indianus Ricardo, 1902
- Chrysops indus Osten Sacken, 1875
- Chrysops infernalis (Quentin, 1979)
- Chrysops inflaticornis Austen, 1910
- Chrysops insulensis Austen, 1912
- Chrysops intrudens Williston, 1895
- Chrysops italicus Meigen, 1804
- Chrysops japonicus Wiedemann, 1828
- Chrysops laetus Fabricius, 1805
- Chrysops langi Bequaert, 1930
- Chrysops laniger Loew, 1860
- Chrysops lateralis Wiedemann, 1828
- Chrysops laticeps Austen, 1910
- Chrysops latifasciatus Bellardi, 1859
- Chrysops latifrons Brennan, 1935
- Chrysops latitibialis Kröber, 1926
- Chrysops leucospilus Wiedemann, 1828
- Chrysops liaoningensis Xu & Chen, 1977
- Chrysops longicornis Macquart, 1838
- Chrysops longirostris Zeegers, 2015
- Chrysops luteopennis Philip, 1936
- Chrysops lutzi Kröber, 1925
- Chrysops macquarti Philip, 1961
- Chrysops madagascarensis Ricardo, 1902
- Chrysops magnificus Austen, 1911
- Chrysops makerovi Pleske, 1910
- Chrysops matilei Quentin, 2000
- Chrysops mauritanicus Costa, 1893
- Chrysops maximus Kröber, 1929
- Chrysops melaenus Hine, 1925
- Chrysops melicharii Mik, 1898
- Chrysops mexicanus Kröber, 1925
- Chrysops mitis Osten Sacken, 1875
- Chrysops mlokosiewiczi Bigot, 1880
- Chrysops moechus Osten Sacken, 1875
- Chrysops molestus Wiedemann, 1828
- Chrysops montanus Osten Sacken, 1875
- Chrysops mutatus Pechuman, 1939
- Chrysops neavei Austen, 1910
- Chrysops neobrasiliensis Kröber, 1929
- Chrysops nigribimbo Whitney, 1879
- Chrysops nigricorpus Lutz, 1911
- Chrysops nigrobasalis Kröber, 1927
- Chrysops noctifer Osten Sacken, 1877
- Chrysops obliquefasciata Macquart, 1838
- Chrysops obsoletus Wiedemann, 1821
- Chrysops okavangoensis Dias, 1989
- Chrysops olivaceus Kröber, 1926
- Chrysops omissus Lutz, 1911
- Chrysops oxianus Pleske, 1910
- Chrysops pachycerus Williston, 1887
- Chrysops pachycnemius Hine, 1905
- Chrysops pallidefemoratus Kröber, 1930
- Chrysops pallidiventris (Kröber, 1922)
- Chrysops pallidulus Austen, 1914
- Chrysops paradesignata Liu & Wang, 1977
- Chrysops paraguayensis Brèthes, 1910
- Chrysops parallelogrammus Zeller, 1842
- Chrysops parvifascius Lutz, 1911
- Chrysops parvulus Daecke, 1907
- Chrysops passosi Dias, 1980
- Chrysops patricia Pechuman, 1953
- Chrysops pauliani Oldroyd, 1957
- Chrysops pechumani Philip, 1941
- Chrysops pellucidus Fabricius, 1805
- Chrysops perpensus Austen, 1937
- Chrysops peruvianus Kröber, 1925
- Chrysops petersi Oldroyd, 1957
- Chrysops pettigrewi Ricardo, 1913
- Chrysops philipi Burger, 1985
- Chrysops pikei Whitney, 1904
- Chrysops piresi Dias, 1985
- Chrysops potanini Pleske, 1910
- Chrysops proclivis Osten Sacken, 1877
- Chrysops provocans Walker, 1850
- Chrysops pseudofuscipennis Dias, 1974
- Chrysops pudicus Osten Sacken, 1875
- Chrysops pusillulus Austen, 1910
- Chrysops reicherti Fairchild, 1937
- Chrysops relictus Meigen, 1820
- Chrysops renjifoi Bequaert, 1946
- Chrysops reticulatus Wilkerson, 1979
- Chrysops ricardoae Pleske, 1910
- Chrysops rossi Philip, 1960
- Chrysops rufipes Meigen, 1820
- Chrysops sackeni Hine, 1903
- Chrysops sandyi Baier, 1999
- Chrysops scalaratus Bellardi, 1859
- Chrysops seguyi Piton, 1940
- Chrysops sejunctus Szilády, 1919
- Chrysops semiignitus Kröber, 1930
- Chrysops separatus Hine, 1907
- Chrysops sepulcralis Fabricius, 1794
- Chrysops sequax Williston, 1887
- Chrysops shermani Hine, 1907
- Chrysops signifer Walker, 1861
- Chrysops silaceus Austen, 1907
- Chrysops silviaris Philip & Mackerras, 1960
- Chrysops silvifacies Philip, 1963
- Chrysops sinensis Walker, 1856
- Chrysops sordidus Osten Sacken, 1875
- Chrysops soror Kröber, 1925
- Chrysops srilankensis Burger & Chainey, 2000
- Chrysops stackelbergi Olsufiev, 1937
- Chrysops stackelbergiellus Olsufiev, 1967
- Chrysops stekhoveni Philip, 1960
- Chrysops stimulans Walker, 1850
- Chrysops stonei Pechuman, 1977
- Chrysops streptobalius Speiser, 1912
- Chrysops striatulus Pechuman, 1943
- Chrysops striatus Osten Sacken, 1875
- Chrysops suavis Loew, 1858
- Chrysops subcaecutiens Bellardi, 1859
- Chrysops surdus Osten Sacken, 1877
- Chrysops szechuanensis Kröber, 1933
- Chrysops tarimi Olsufiev, 1979
- Chrysops thailandensis Philip, 1960
- Chrysops tidwelli Philip & Jones, 1962
- Chrysops translucens Macquart, 1838
- Chrysops trifaria Macquart, 1838
- Chrysops trisignatus Kröber, 1926
- Chrysops tristis (Fabricius, 1798)
- Chrysops tumidicornis Baier, 1999
- Chrysops turanicus Olsufiev, 1937
- Chrysops univittatus Macquart, 1855
- Chrysops unizona (Szilády, 1926)
- Chrysops upsilon Philip, 1950
- Chrysops uruguayensis Lutz, 1909
- Chrysops validus Loew, 1858
- Chrysops varians Wiedemann, 1828
- Chrysops variegatus (De Geer, 1776)
- Chrysops venus Philip, 1950
- Chrysops viduatus (Fabricius, 1794)
- Chrysops vietnamensis Philip, 1979
- Chrysops violovitshi Zakharov, 1990
- Chrysops virgulatus Bellardi, 1859
- Chrysops vittatus Wiedemann, 1821
- Chrysops weberi Bequaert, 1946
- Chrysops wileyae Philip, 1955
- Chrysops willistoni Hine, 1925
- Chrysops woodi Neave, 1915
- Chrysops wulpi Kröber, 1929
- Chrysops yamaguchii Simizu & Takahasi, 1975
- Chrysops zahrai Oldroyd, 1952
- Chrysops zayasi Bequaert, 1946
- Chrysops zinzala Philip, 1942
