= Chrysops fuliginosus =

Scientific classification
- Kingdom: Animalia
- Phylum: Arthropoda
- Clade: Pancrustacea
- Class: Insecta
- Order: Diptera
- Family: Tabanidae
- Tribe: Chrysopsini
- Genus: Chrysops
- Species: C. fuliginosus

Binomial name
- Chrysops fuliginosus Wiedemann, 1821

Synonyms
- Chrysops plangens Wiedemann, 1828; Chrysops confusus Harris, 1835

Species of fly

Chrysops fuliginosus is a species of deer fly in the family Tabanidae.

== Distribution ==
Canada, United States.
