= Chrysops ater =

Scientific classification
- Kingdom: Animalia
- Phylum: Arthropoda
- Clade: Pancrustacea
- Class: Insecta
- Order: Diptera
- Family: Tabanidae
- Tribe: Chrysopsini
- Genus: Chrysops
- Species: C. ater

Binomial name
- Chrysops ater Macquart, 1850

Synonyms
- Chrysops fugax Osten Sacken, 1875; Chrysops carbonarius var. nubiapex Philip, 1955

Species of fly

Chrysops ater is a species of deer fly in the family Tabanidae.

== Distribution ==
Canada, United States.
