= Chrysops furcatus =

Scientific classification
- Kingdom: Animalia
- Phylum: Arthropoda
- Clade: Pancrustacea
- Class: Insecta
- Order: Diptera
- Family: Tabanidae
- Subfamily: Chrysopsinae
- Tribe: Chrysopsini
- Genus: Chrysops
- Species: C. furcatus

Binomial name
- Chrysops furcatus Walker, 1848

Synonyms
- Chrysops chagnoni Philip, 1955; Chrysops lupus Whitney, 1904

Species of fly

Chrysops furcatus is a species of deer fly in the family Tabanidae. It is can be found in Canada and the United States.
