= C. montanus =

C. montanus may refer to:

- Callistemon montanus, or mountain bottlebrush
- Cercocarpus montanus, or mountain mahogany
- Caelostomus montanus, a ground beetle in the subfamily Pterostichinae
- Chalcides montanus, a skink found in the Atlas Mountains in Morocco
- Chrysops montanus, a deer fly of the family Tabanidae
- Cophixalus montanus, a frog species endemic to Indonesia
- Cybaeus montanus, a spider of the family Cybaeidae
