= Chrysops frigidus =

Scientific classification
- Kingdom: Animalia
- Phylum: Arthropoda
- Clade: Pancrustacea
- Class: Insecta
- Order: Diptera
- Family: Tabanidae
- Subfamily: Chrysopsinae
- Tribe: Chrysopsini
- Genus: Chrysops
- Species: C. frigidus

Binomial name
- Chrysops frigidus Osten Sacken, 1875

Synonyms
- Chrysops canadensis Kröber, 1926; Chrysops frigidus var. xanthas Philip, 1950

Species of fly

Chrysops frigidus is a species of deer fly in the family Tabanidae.

== Distribution ==
Canada, United States.
