= Chrysops excitans =

Scientific classification
- Kingdom: Animalia
- Phylum: Arthropoda
- Clade: Pancrustacea
- Class: Insecta
- Order: Diptera
- Family: Tabanidae
- Subfamily: Chrysopsinae
- Tribe: Chrysopsini
- Genus: Chrysops
- Species: C. excitans

Binomial name
- Chrysops excitans Walker, 1850

Synonyms
- Chrysops ischiacus Harris, 1835; Chrysops lumbalis Harris, 1925

Species of fly

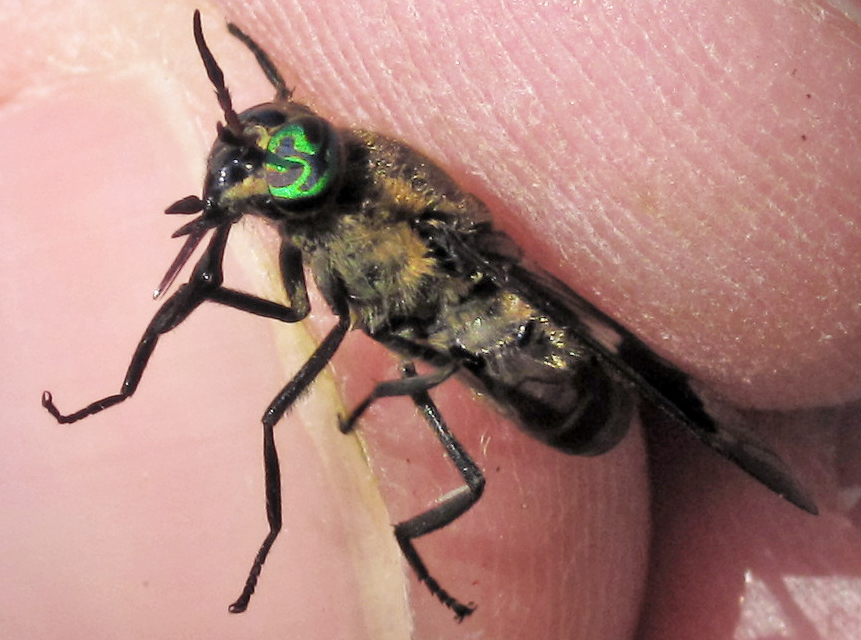

Chrysops excitans is a species of deer fly in the family Tabanidae.

== Distribution ==
Canada, United States.
