= Neochrysops (disambiguation) =

Neochrysops may refer to one of two different genera of insects:

- Neochrysops is a monotypic genus of horse fly containing only the species Neochrysops globosus.
- Neochrysops is a synonym for the butterfly genus Lepidochrysops.
