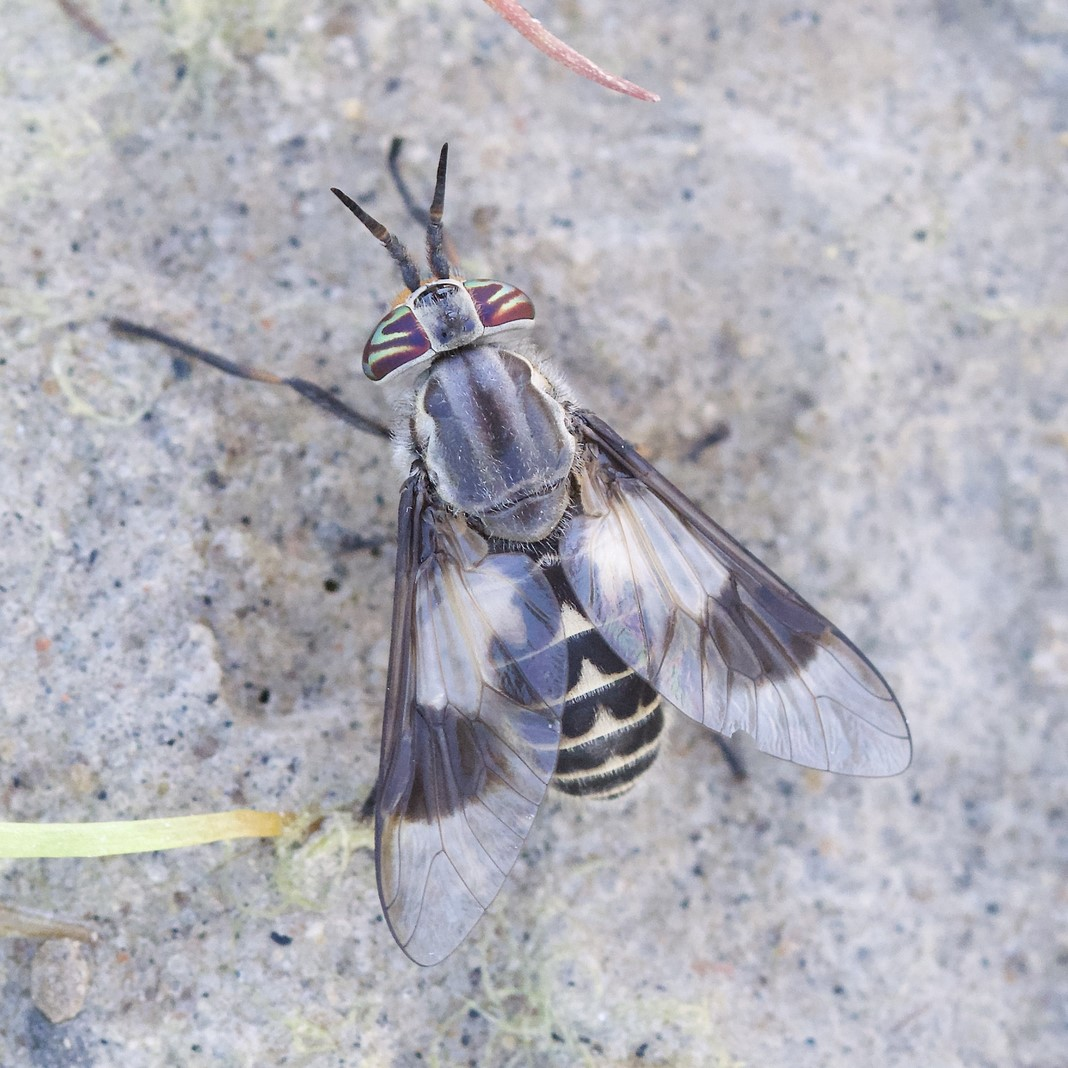

Scientific classification
- Kingdom: Animalia
- Phylum: Arthropoda
- Clade: Pancrustacea
- Class: Insecta
- Order: Diptera
- Family: Tabanidae
- Subfamily: Chrysopsinae
- Tribe: Chrysopsini
- Genus: Chrysops
- Species: C. aestuans

Binomial name
- Chrysops aestuans Wulp, 1867

Synonyms
- Chrysops abaestuans Philip, 1941; Chrysops moerens var. confusus Kröber, 1926; Chrysops moerens Walker, 1848; Chrysops pseudoconfusus Philip, 1959

= Chrysops aestuans =

Species of fly

Chrysops aestuans is a species of deer fly in the family Tabanidae.

== Distribution ==
Canada, United States.
