= Acellomyia =

Scientific classification
- Kingdom: Animalia
- Phylum: Arthropoda
- Class: Insecta
- Order: Diptera
- Family: Tabanidae
- Subfamily: Tabaninae
- Tribe: Diachlorini
- Genus: Acellomyia; Gonzalez, 1999

Type species
- Tabanus paulseni Philippi, 1865

Genus of flies

Acellomyia is a genus of horse flies in the family Tabanidae.

== Species ==
- Acellomyia casablanca González, 2017
- Acellomyia fontanensis (Coscarón, 1962)
- Acellomyia mapuche (Coscarón & Philip, 1967)
- Acellomyia paulseni (Philippi, 1865)
- Acellomyia puyehue González, 2017
