= Chrysops surdus =

Scientific classification
- Kingdom: Animalia
- Phylum: Arthropoda
- Clade: Pancrustacea
- Class: Insecta
- Order: Diptera
- Family: Tabanidae
- Subfamily: Chrysopsinae
- Tribe: Chrysopsini
- Genus: Chrysops
- Species: C. surdus

Binomial name
- Chrysops surdus Osten Sacken, 1877

Synonyms
- Chrysops proclivis var. piceus Philip, 1936

Species of fly

Chrysops surdus is a species of deer fly in the family Tabanidae.

== Distribution ==
Canada, United States.
