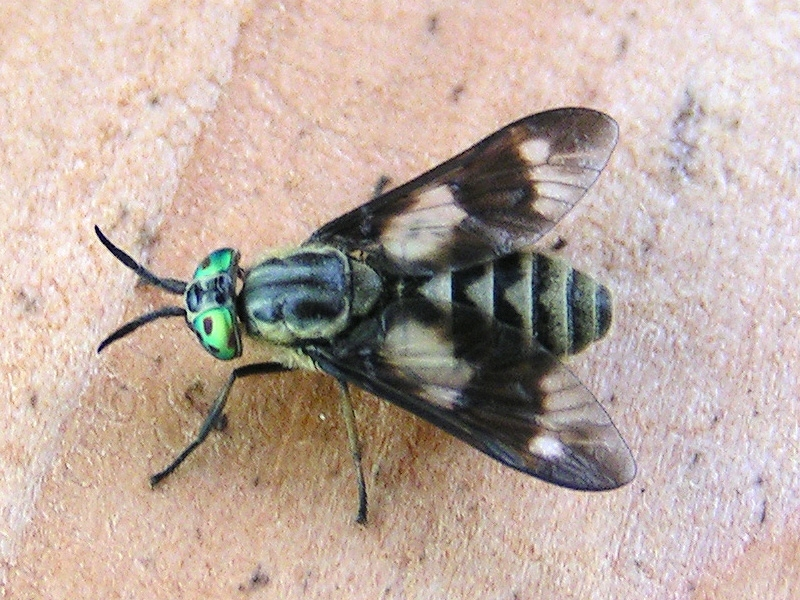
- Adult female

Scientific classification
- Kingdom: Animalia
- Phylum: Arthropoda
- Clade: Pancrustacea
- Class: Insecta
- Order: Diptera
- Family: Tabanidae
- Subfamily: Chrysopsinae
- Tribe: Chrysopsini
- Genus: Chrysops
- Species: C. relictus

Binomial name
- Chrysops relictus Meigen, 1820

Synonyms
- Chrysops melanopleurus Wahlberg, 1848; Chrysops morio Zetterstedt, 1849; Chrysops relictus f. chlorosis Goffe, 1931; Chrysops relictus f. clarus Goffe, 1931; Chrysops relictus f. conspicuus Goffe, 1931; Chrysops relictus f. inconspicuus Goffe, 1931

= Chrysops relictus =

Species of fly

Chrysops relictus, the twin-lobed deerfly, is a largish European and Asian deerfly of about 8–10.5 millimetres (0.31–0.41 in) length. The larvae feed upon organic matter in damp soils, and are termed hydrobionts in that they inhabit areas of high water content.
