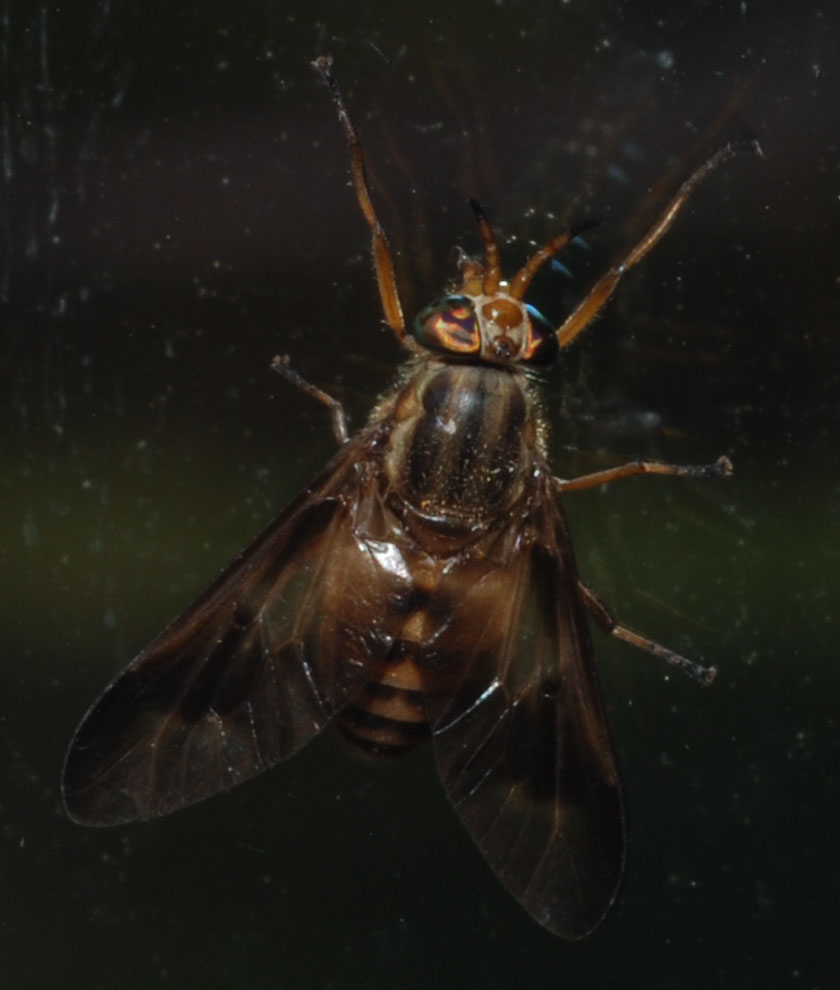

Scientific classification
- Kingdom: Animalia
- Phylum: Arthropoda
- Clade: Pancrustacea
- Class: Insecta
- Order: Diptera
- Family: Tabanidae
- Subfamily: Chrysopsinae
- Tribe: Chrysopsini
- Genus: Chrysops
- Species: C. flavidus

Binomial name
- Chrysops flavidus Wiedemann, 1821

Synonyms
- Chrysops canifrons Walker, 1848; Chrysops pallida Macquart, 1838; Chrysops pallidus Bellardi, 1859; Chrysops guiterasi Brunetti, 1923

= Chrysops flavidus =

Species of fly

Chrysops flavidus is a species of deer fly in the family Tabanidae. The species is identifiable by its yellow legs.

== Distribution ==
United States.

== Subspecies ==
- Chrysops flavidus celatus Pechuman
- Chrysops flavidus flavidus Wiedemann, 1821
- Chrysops flavidus reicherti Fairchild
