= Chrysops indus =

Scientific classification
- Kingdom: Animalia
- Phylum: Arthropoda
- Clade: Pancrustacea
- Class: Insecta
- Order: Diptera
- Family: Tabanidae
- Subfamily: Chrysopsinae
- Tribe: Chrysopsini
- Genus: Chrysops
- Species: C. indus

Binomial name
- Chrysops indus Osten Sacken, 1875

Synonyms
- Chrysops pilumnus Kröber, 1926

Species of fly

Chrysops indus is a species of deer fly in the family Tabanidae.

== Distribution ==
Canada, United States.
