= Chrysops pachycnemius =

Scientific classification
- Kingdom: Animalia
- Phylum: Arthropoda
- Clade: Pancrustacea
- Class: Insecta
- Order: Diptera
- Family: Tabanidae
- Subfamily: Chrysopsinae
- Tribe: Chrysopsini
- Genus: Chrysops
- Species: C. pachycnemius

Binomial name
- Chrysops pachycnemius Hine, 1905

Synonyms
- Chrysops engeli Kröber, 1930

Species of fly

Chrysops pachycnemius is a species of deer fly in the family Tabanidae.

== Distribution ==
Mexico, Guatemala, El Salvador.
