= Chrysops carbonarius =

Scientific classification
- Kingdom: Animalia
- Phylum: Arthropoda
- Clade: Pancrustacea
- Class: Insecta
- Order: Diptera
- Family: Tabanidae
- Subfamily: Chrysopsinae
- Tribe: Chrysopsini
- Genus: Chrysops
- Species: C. carbonarius

Binomial name
- Chrysops carbonarius Walker, 1848

Species of fly

Chrysops carbonarius is a species of deer fly in the family Tabanidae.

== Distribution ==
Canada, United States.
