= Chrysops moechus =

Scientific classification
- Kingdom: Animalia
- Phylum: Arthropoda
- Clade: Pancrustacea
- Class: Insecta
- Order: Diptera
- Family: Tabanidae
- Subfamily: Chrysopsinae
- Tribe: Chrysopsini
- Genus: Chrysops
- Species: C. moechus

Binomial name
- Chrysops moechus Osten Sacken, 1875

Species of fly

Chrysops moechus, the adulterous deer fly, is a species of deer fly in the family Tabanidae.

== Distribution ==
Canada, United States.
