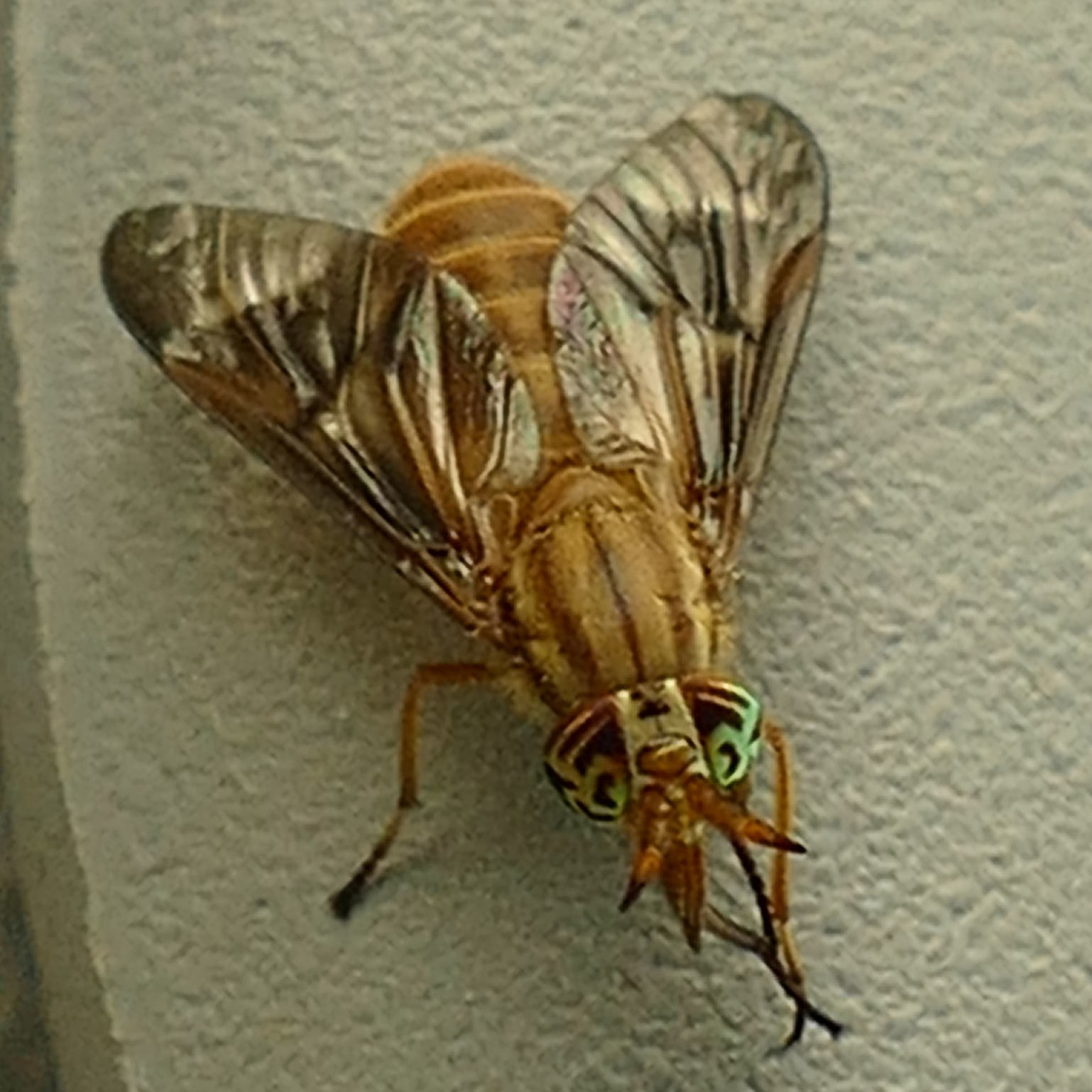

Scientific classification
- Kingdom: Animalia
- Phylum: Arthropoda
- Clade: Pancrustacea
- Class: Insecta
- Order: Diptera
- Family: Tabanidae
- Subfamily: Chrysopsinae
- Tribe: Chrysopsini
- Genus: Chrysops
- Species: C. brunneus

Binomial name
- Chrysops brunneus Hine, 1903

= Chrysops brunneus =

Species of fly

Chrysops brunneus is a species of deer fly in the family Tabanidae. It is found in the United States.
