= Gressittia =

Scientific classification
- Kingdom: Animalia
- Phylum: Arthropoda
- Class: Insecta
- Order: Diptera
- Family: Tabanidae
- Subfamily: Chrysopsinae
- Tribe: Bouvieromyiini
- Genus: Gressittia; Philip & Mackerras, 1960

Type species
- Gastroxides fuscus Schuurmans Stekhoven, 1926

Genus of insects

Gressittia is a genus of horse flies in the family Tabanidae.

== Species ==
- Gressittia apicalis Philip & Mackerras, 1960
- Gressittia aterrima (Schuurmans Stekhoven, 1926)
- Gressittia baoxingensis Wang & Liu, 1990
- Gressittia birumis Philip & Mackerras, 1960
- Gressittia emeishanensis Wang & Liu, 1990
- Gressittia flava Philip & Mackerras, 1960
- Gressittia fusca (Schuurmans Stekhoven, 1926)
- Gressittia mackerrasi Philip, 1963
- Gressittia media Philip & Mackerras, 1960
- Gressittia nepalensis Philip & Mackerras, 1960
- Gressittia pulchripennis (Austen, 1937)
- Gressittia titsadaysi Philip, 1980
