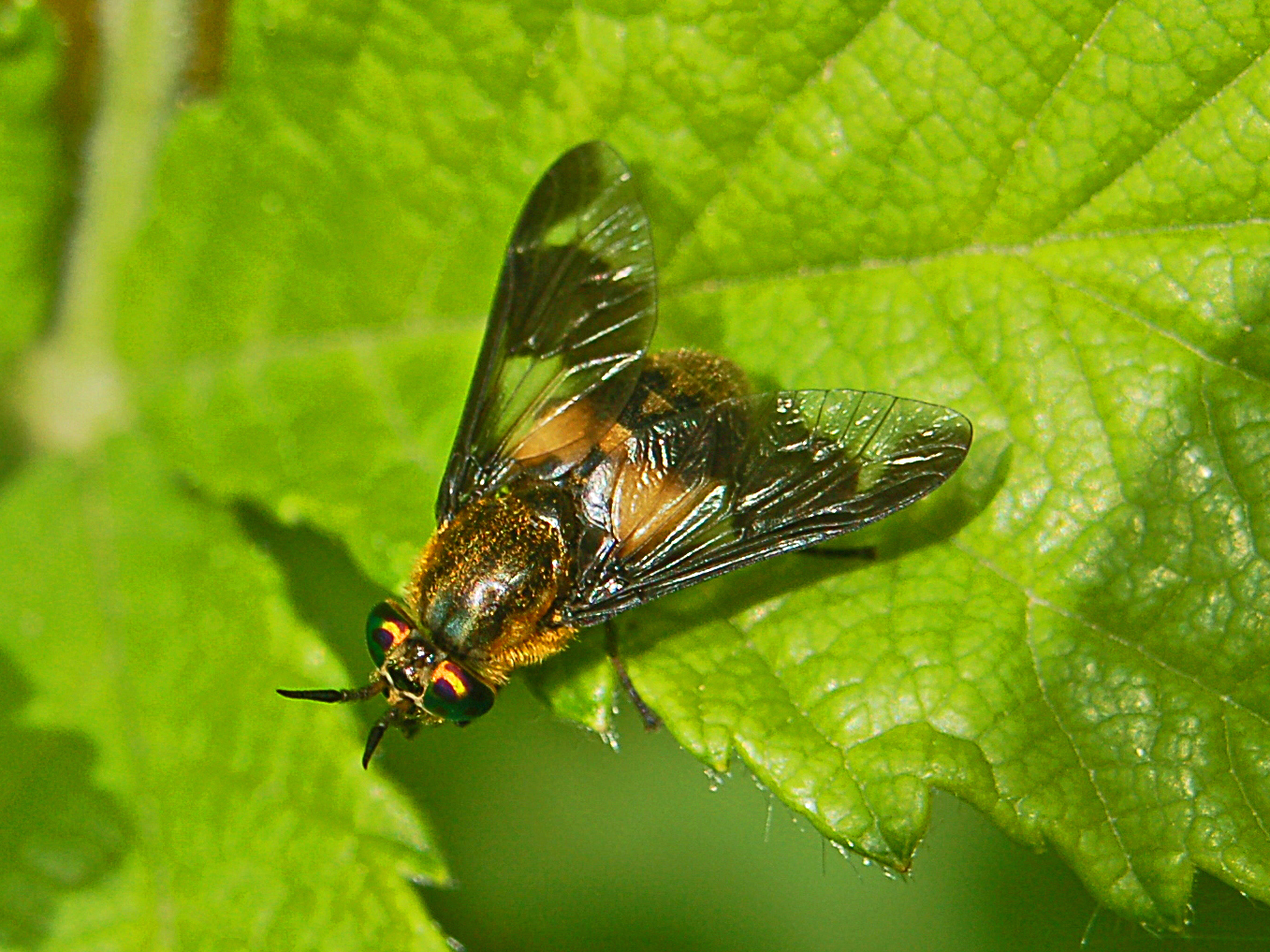
- Female of Chrysops caecutiens
- Male on Leucanthemum vulgare

Scientific classification
- Kingdom: Animalia
- Phylum: Arthropoda
- Clade: Pancrustacea
- Class: Insecta
- Order: Diptera
- Family: Tabanidae
- Subfamily: Chrysopsinae
- Tribe: Chrysopsini
- Genus: Chrysops
- Species: C. caecutiens

Binomial name
- Chrysops caecutiens (Linnaeus, 1758)

Synonyms
- Tabanus caecutiens Linnaeus, 1758; Tabanus lugubris Linnaeus, 1761; Tabanus maritimus Scopoli, 1763; Tabanus coecutiens Müller, 1775; Tabanus nubilosus Harris, 1776; Chrysops crudelis Wiedemann, 1828; Chrysops ludens Loew, 1858; Chrysops caecutiens f. meridionalis Strobl, 1906; Chrysops hermanni Kröber, 1920; Chrysops caecutiens var. trifenestratus Kröber, 1920; Chrysops caecutiens f. niger Goffe, 1931; Chrysops caecutiens f. nigrescens Goffe, 1931; Chrysops caecutiens f. obsolescens Goffe, 1931; Chrysops caecutiens f. obsoletus Goffe, 1931; Chrysops caecutiens f. fulvus Goffe, 1931; Chrysops caecutiens f. clarus Goffe, 1931; Chrysops caecutiens f. hyalinatus Goffe, 1931

= Chrysops caecutiens =

Species of deer fly

Chrysops caecutiens, common name splayed deer fly, is a species of horse fly belonging to the family Tabanidae. It is also known by the colloquial name Scotch cleg.

== Description ==
Chrysops caecutiens reaches a length of about 8.5–10 millimetres (0.33–0.39 in). The mesonotum and the scutellum are glossy black with yellow-brown hairs. The compound eyes have red and green reflections, with dark spots. The transparent wings have dark brown patches, located at the top and at the centre of each wing. The abdomen shows distinct black inverted-V marking (hence the common name of "splayed" deer fly). The legs are black, included the tibiae on the middle pair of legs. They are active from May to September.

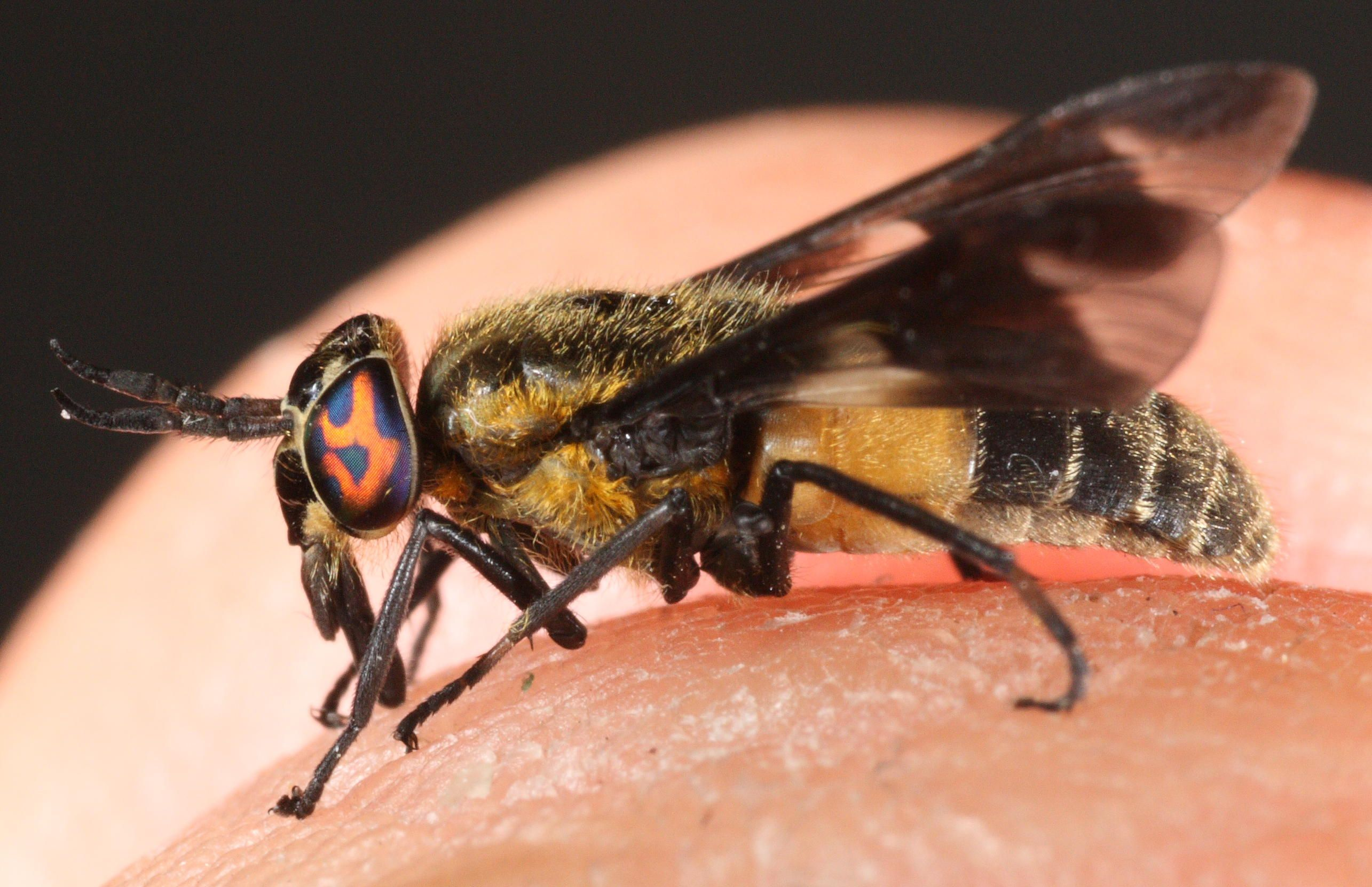
Chrysops caecutiens

== Biology ==
The larvae of the splayed deer fly feed upon algae and organic matter in damp muddy soils. The adult female flies feed on mammalian blood (including on roe deer), in order for their eggs to mature properly. When they bite, they inject saliva with an anti-coagulating agent that prevents the blood from clotting. The structure of the ommatidia in the midregion of the eyes of the females may use high polarization to assist in host-finding. Adult males and females feed also on nectar and pollen of flowers (mainly Leucanthemum vulgare).

== Distribution ==
This species is present in most of Europe, the eastern Palearctic realm, and the Near East.

== Habitat ==
These horseflies preferably live in shaded marshlands and in damp woodlands.
