= Silviomyza =

Scientific classification
- Kingdom: Animalia
- Phylum: Arthropoda
- Class: Insecta
- Order: Diptera
- Family: Tabanidae
- Subfamily: Chrysopsinae
- Tribe: Chrysopsini
- Genus: Silviomyza; Philip & Mackerras, 1960

Type species
- Silvius piceus Szilády, 1926

Genus of insects

Silviomyza is a genus of horse flies in the family Tabanidae.

== Distribution ==
Sri Lanka.

== Species ==
- Silviomyza picea (Szilády, 1926)
