= Chrysops fasciatus =

Scientific classification
- Kingdom: Animalia
- Phylum: Arthropoda
- Clade: Pancrustacea
- Class: Insecta
- Order: Diptera
- Family: Tabanidae
- Subfamily: Chrysopsinae
- Tribe: Chrysopsini
- Genus: Chrysops
- Species: C. fasciatus

Binomial name
- Chrysops fasciatus Wiedemann, 1821

Synonyms
- Chrysops rufitarsis Macquart, 1848

Species of fly

Chrysops fasciatus is a species of deer fly in the family Tabanidae.

== Distribution ==
Andaman Islands, Borneo, Myanmar, Sri Lanka, India, Java, Malaysia, Sumatra.
