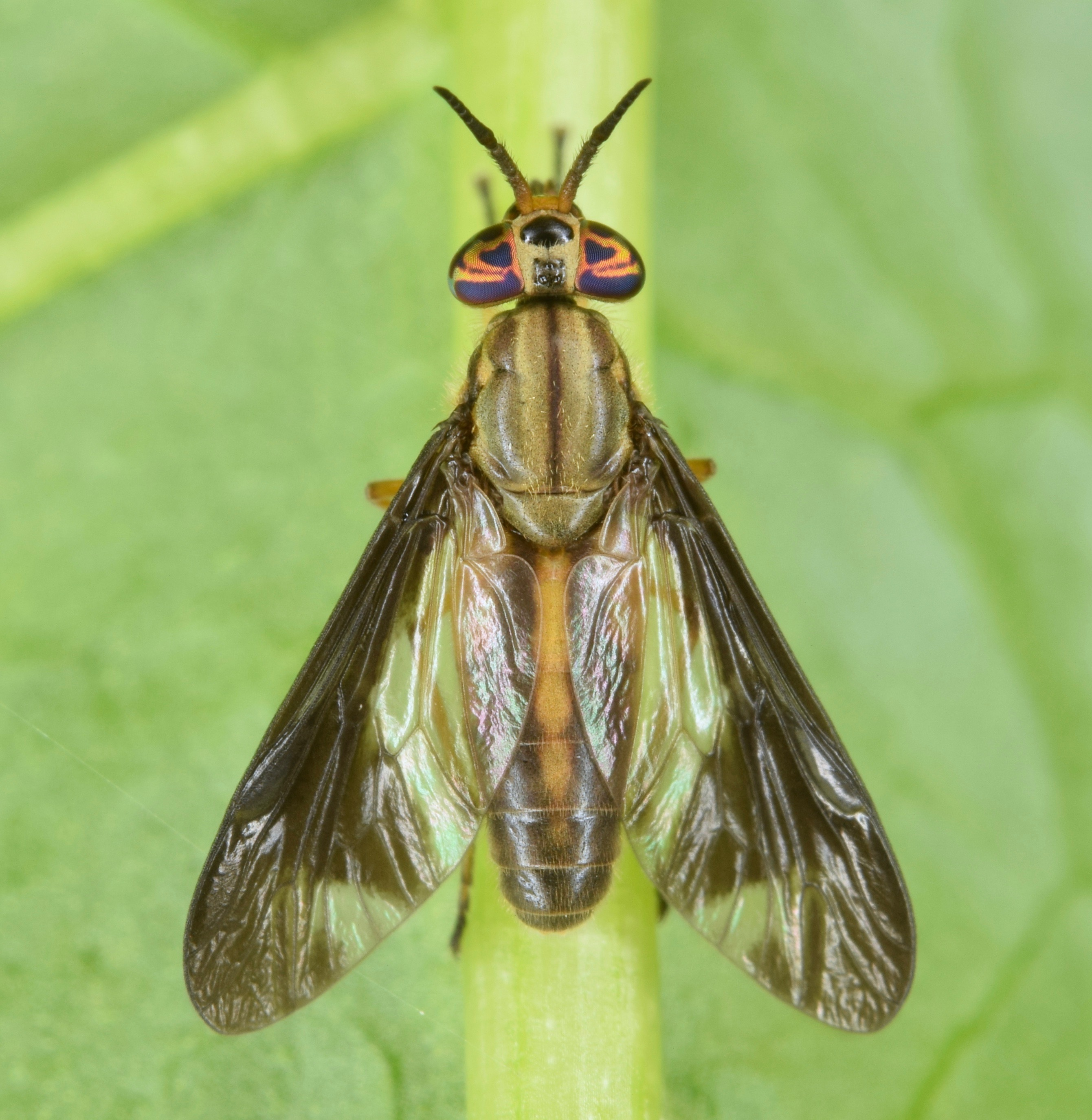
- Chrysops univittatus

Scientific classification
- Kingdom: Animalia
- Phylum: Arthropoda
- Clade: Pancrustacea
- Class: Insecta
- Order: Diptera
- Family: Tabanidae
- Tribe: Chrysopsini
- Genus: Chrysops
- Species: C. univittatus

Binomial name
- Chrysops univittatus Macquart, 1855

Synonyms
- Chrysops fraternus Kröber, 1926; Chrysops wiedemanni Kröber, 1926

= Chrysops univittatus =

Species of fly

Chrysops univittatus is a species of deer fly in the family Tabanidae.

== Distribution ==
Eastern United States and southeastern Canada.
