= Anacimas limbellatus =

Scientific classification
- Kingdom: Animalia
- Phylum: Arthropoda
- Clade: Pancrustacea
- Class: Insecta
- Order: Diptera
- Family: Tabanidae
- Subfamily: Tabaninae
- Tribe: Diachlorini
- Genus: Anacimas
- Species: A. limbellatus

Binomial name
- Anacimas limbellatus Enderlein, 1923

Synonyms
- Anacimas geropgon Philip, 1936

Species of insect

Anacimas limbellatus is a species of horse flies in the family Tabanidae.

== Distribution ==
A. limbellatus is found in the United States.
