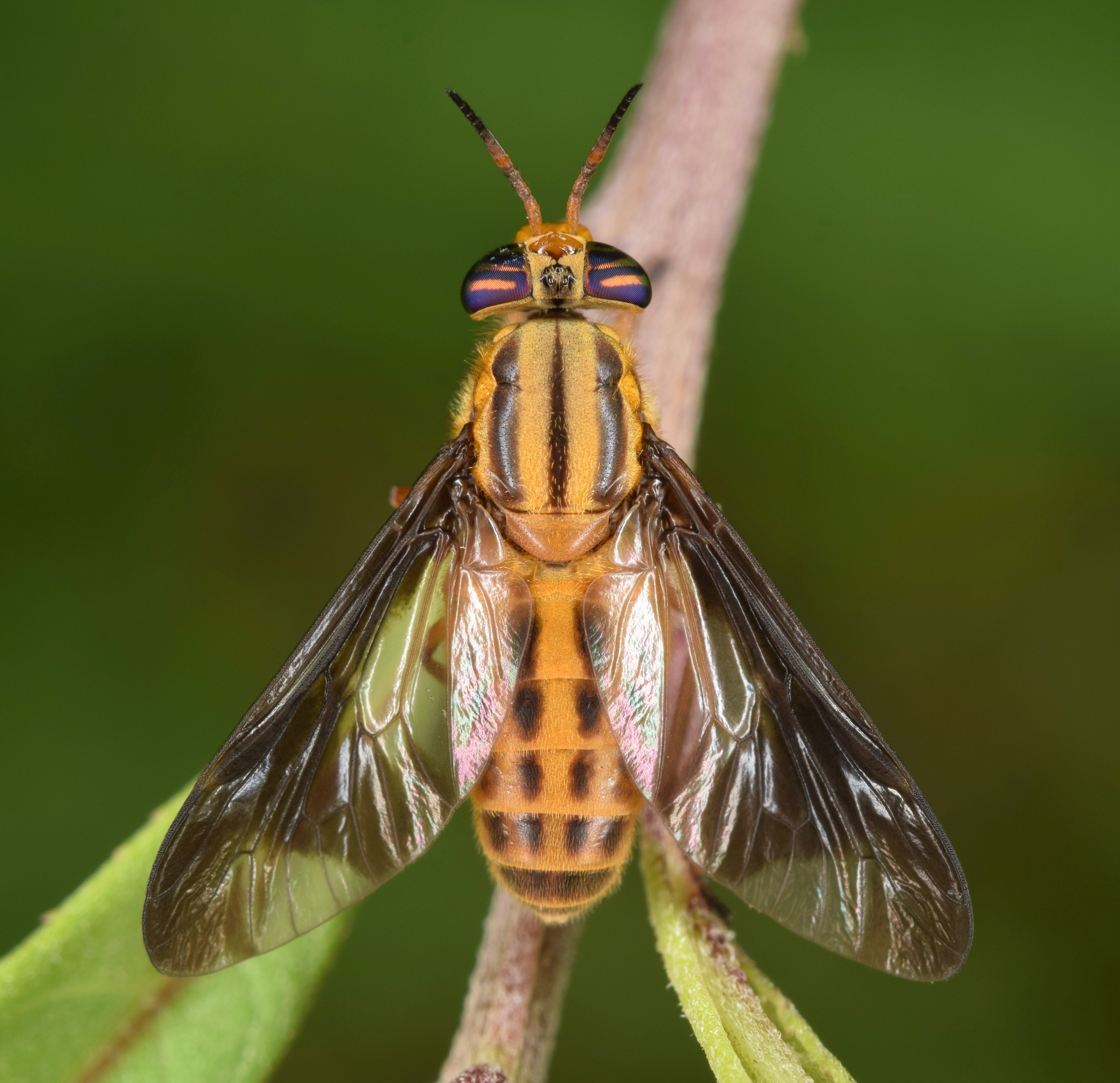

Scientific classification
- Kingdom: Animalia
- Phylum: Arthropoda
- Class: Insecta
- Order: Diptera
- Family: Tabanidae
- Tribe: Chrysopsini
- Genus: Chrysops
- Species: C. vittatus

Binomial name
- Chrysops vittatus Wiedemann, 1821

Synonyms
- Chrysops areolatus Walker, 1848; Chrysops lineatus Jaennicke, 1867; Chrysops ornatus Kröber, 1926

= Chrysops vittatus =

Species of fly

Chrysops vittatus is a species of deer fly in the family Tabanidae.

== Distribution ==
United States and Canada.
