= Melissomorpha =

Scientific classification
- Kingdom: Animalia
- Phylum: Arthropoda
- Class: Insecta
- Order: Diptera
- Family: Tabanidae
- Subfamily: Chrysopsinae
- Tribe: Chrysopsini
- Genus: Melissomorpha; Ricardo, 1906

Type species
- Melissomorpha indiana Ricardo, 1906

Genus of insects

Melissomorpha is a genus of horse flies in the family Tabanidae.

== Distribution ==
India.

== Species ==
- Melissomorpha indiana Ricardo, 1906
