= Anacimas =

Scientific classification
- Kingdom: Animalia
- Phylum: Arthropoda
- Clade: Pancrustacea
- Class: Insecta
- Order: Diptera
- Family: Tabanidae
- Subfamily: Tabaninae
- Tribe: Diachlorini
- Genus: Anacimas; Enderlein, 1923

Type species
- Anacimas limbellatus Enderlein, 1923

Genus of flies

Anacimas is a genus of horse flies in the family Tabanidae.

== Species ==
- Anacimas dodgei (Whitney, 1879)
- Anacimas limbellatus Enderlein, 1923
