= Nemorius =

Scientific classification
- Kingdom: Animalia
- Phylum: Arthropoda
- Class: Insecta
- Order: Diptera
- Family: Tabanidae
- Subfamily: Chrysopsinae
- Tribe: Chrysopsini
- Genus: Nemorius; Rondani, 1856

Type species
- Chrysops vitripennis Meigen, 1820

Synonyms
- Haematophila Verrall, 1882; Haemophila Kriechbaumer, 1873

Genus of insects

Nemorius is a genus of horse flies in the family Tabanidae.

== Species ==
- Nemorius baghdadensis Ježek, 1977
- Nemorius caucasicus (Olsufiev, 1937)
- Nemorius himalayensis Chvála, 1969
- Nemorius irritans (Ricardo, 1901)
- Nemorius oenderi Ježek, 1990
- Nemorius shapuricus (Abbassian-Lintzen, 1960)
- Nemorius vitripennis (Meigen, 1820)
