= Surcoufia =

Scientific classification
- Kingdom: Animalia
- Phylum: Arthropoda
- Class: Insecta
- Order: Diptera
- Family: Tabanidae
- Subfamily: Chrysopsinae
- Tribe: Chrysopsini
- Genus: Surcoufia; Kröber, 1922

Type species
- Surcoufia paradoxa Kröber, 1922

Synonyms
- Heterosilvius Olsufjev, 1970

Genus of insects

Surcoufia is a genus of horse flies in the family Tabanidae.

== Species ==
- Surcoufia paradoxa Kröber, 1922
