= Anacimas dodgei =

Scientific classification
- Kingdom: Animalia
- Phylum: Arthropoda
- Clade: Pancrustacea
- Class: Insecta
- Order: Diptera
- Family: Tabanidae
- Subfamily: Tabaninae
- Tribe: Diachlorini
- Genus: Anacimas
- Species: A. dodgei

Binomial name
- Anacimas dodgei (Whitney, 1879)

Synonyms
- Tabanus dodgei Whitney, 1879

Species of insect

Anacimas dodgei is a species of horse flies in the family Tabanidae.

== Distribution ==
A. dodgei is found in the United States.
