= Acellomyia paulseni =

Scientific classification
- Kingdom: Animalia
- Phylum: Arthropoda
- Clade: Pancrustacea
- Class: Insecta
- Order: Diptera
- Family: Tabanidae
- Subfamily: Tabaninae
- Tribe: Diachlorini
- Genus: Acellomyia
- Species: A. paulseni

Binomial name
- Acellomyia paulseni (Philippi, 1865)

Synonyms
- Tabanus paulseni Philippi, 1865; Archiplatius trianguliferus Enderlein, 1925; Dasybasis trianguliferus var. ochraceus Enderlein, 1925

Species of insect

Acellomyia paulseni is a species of horse flies in the family Tabanidae.

== Distribution ==
It is found in Chile and Argentina.
