= Neochrysops =

Scientific classification
- Kingdom: Animalia
- Phylum: Arthropoda
- Class: Insecta
- Order: Diptera
- Family: Tabanidae
- Subfamily: Chrysopsinae
- Tribe: Chrysopsini
- Genus: Neochrysops; Walton, 1918

Genus of insects

Neochrysops is a genus of horse flies in the family Tabanidae.

== Distribution ==
United States.

== Species ==
- Neochrysops globosus Walton, 1918
