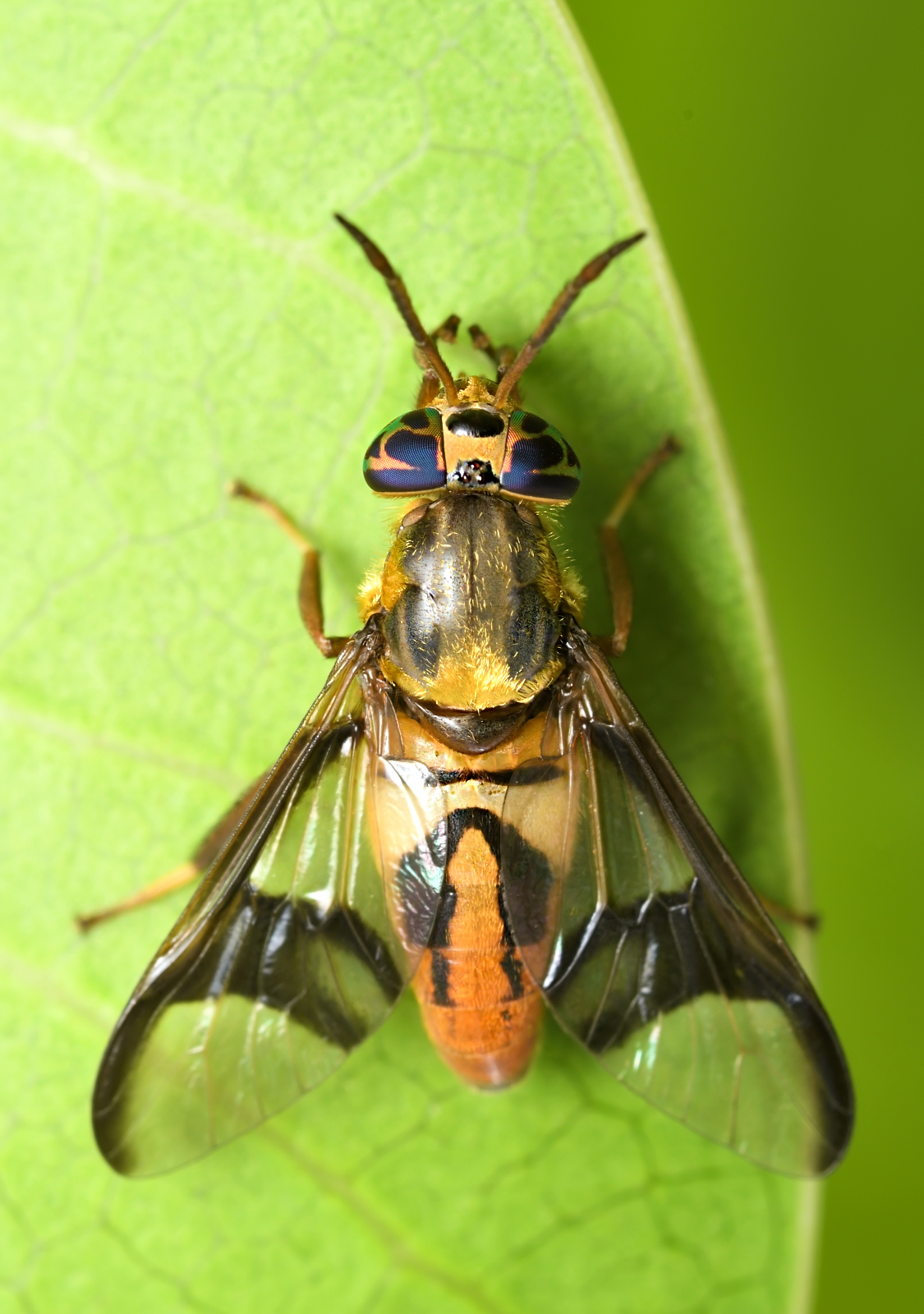
- Adult female

Scientific classification
- Kingdom: Animalia
- Phylum: Arthropoda
- Clade: Pancrustacea
- Class: Insecta
- Order: Diptera
- Family: Tabanidae
- Genus: Chrysops
- Species: C. dispar

Binomial name
- Chrysops dispar Fabricius, 1798

= Chrysops dispar =

Species of fly

Chrysops dispar is a species of horsefly found widely distributed in the Indo-Malayan realm. Females feed on blood prior to laying eggs. The species is differentiated from others in the genus by the patterning of black on the abdomen segments and the dark patterning of the wings. There may however be cryptic species within the wide distribution range from India to Southeast Asia (crossing Weber's Line to Maluku).

Chrysops dispar has an inverted v-mark on the abdomen that extends to the 3, 4th, and later abdominal segments. The scutellum is brown and the hind femora and tibiae are dark in some specimens. The females have the eyes separated on the front by a tomentose strip with a bare oval to spherical frontal callus. The eyes are green or golden with purple bands and spots in life. The male has the compound eyes contiguous (touching each other). The maxillary palps are shorter and slenderer in males. This species can transmit livestock diseases such as those caused by Trypanosoma evansi and Pasteurella multocida. Although morphologically identified and with a large distribution range, the species shows high sequence diversity within populations.
