= Cornelius Becker Philip =

American entomologist

Cornelius Becker Philip (1900–1987) was an American entomologist, noted for assigning comedic names to species he described.

== Works ==
- Philip, C.B. 1931. The Tabanidae (horseflies) of Minnesota. With special reference to their biologies and taxonomy. Technical Bulletin of the Agricultural Experimental Station, University of Minnesota 80, 132 pp., 4 pls.
- Philip, C.B. 1936. New Tabanidae (horseflies) with notes on certain species of the longus group of Tabanus. Ohio Journal of Science36: 149-156.
- Philip, C.B. 1936. The furcatus group of western North American flies of the genus Chrysops (Diptera: Tabanidae). Proceedings of the Entomological Society of Washington 37[1935]: 153-161. [1936.01.17]
- Philip, C.B. 1936. An interesting new horsefly from North Carolina (Diptera: Tabanidae). Entomological News 47: 229-231. [1936.11.12]
- Philip, C.B. 1937. New horseflies (Tabanidae, Diptera) from the southwestern United States. The Pan-Pacific Entomologist 13: 64-67. [1937.05.04]
- Philip, C.B. 1937. Notes on certain males of North American horseflies (Tabanidae). II. The affinis or 'red-sided' group of Tabanus sens. lat., with a key to the females. The Canadian Entomologist 69: 35-40, 49-58. [1937.05.04]
- Philip, C.B. 1941. Notes on Nearctic Tabaninae (Diptera). Part I. Stenotabanus, Atylotus, and Tabanus s. str.; Part II. Tabanus S. lat. and Hybomitra. The Canadian Entomologist 73: 105-110; 142-153.
- Philip, C.B. 1941. Notes on three western genera of flies (Diptera, Tabanidae). Bulletin of the Brooklyn Entomological Society 36: 185-199.
- Philip, C.B. 1941. Notes on Nearctic Pangoniinae (Diptera, Tabanidae). Proceedings of the Entomological Society of Washington 43: 113-130, 1 pl. [1941.06.27]
- Philip, C.B. 1942. Further notes on Nearctic Tabanidae (Diptera). Proc. New Engl. Zool. Club 21: 55-68.
- Philip, C.B. 1943. New Neotropical Tabanidae (Diptera). Journal of the New York Entomological Society 51: 111-116. [1943.??.??]
- Philip, C.B. 1950. New North American Tabanidae (Diptera). Part II. Tabanidae [sic] [=Tabaninae]; III. Notes on Tabanus molestus and related horseflies with a prominent single row of triangles on the abdomen. Annals of the Entomological Society of America 43: 115-122; 240-248. [1950.04.24]
- Philip, C.B. 1950. New North American Tabanidae (Diptera). Part I. Pangoniinae. Annals of the Entomological Society of America (1949) 42: 451-460. [1950.01.20]
- Philip, C.B. 1953. The genus Chrysozona Meigen in North America (Diptera, Tabanidae). Proceedings of the Entomological Society of Washington 55: 247-251. [1953.11.13]
- Philip, C.B. 1954. New North American Tabanidae, VII. Descriptions of Tabaninae from Mexico (Diptera). American Museum Novitates 1695, 26 pp. [1954.??.??]
- Philip, C.B. 1954. New North American Tabanidae (Diptera). VI. Descriptions of Tabaninae and new distributional data. Annals of the Entomological Society of America 47: 25-33. [1954.05.04]
- Philip, C.B. 1954. New North American Tabanidae. VIII. Notes on and keys to the genera and species of Pangoniinae exclusive of Chrysops. Revista Brasileira de Entomologia 2: 13-60.
- Philip, C.B. 1955. New North American Tabanidae. IX. Notes on and keys to the genus Chrysops Meigen. Revista Brasileira de Entomologia 3: 47-128.
- Philip, C.B. 1956. Records of horseflies in Northeast Asia. Japanese Journal of Sanitary Zoology 7: 221-230. [1956.??.??]
- Philip, C.B. 1957. New records of Tabanidae (Diptera) in the Antilles. American Museum Novitates 1858, 16 pp. [1957.11.29]
- Philip, C.B. 1958. Five new species of Tabanidae (Diptera) from Mexico and Brazil. Journal of the Kansas Entomological Society 31: 177-184. [1958.05.30]
- Philip, C.B. 1958. New records of Tabanidae (Diptera) in the Antilles. Supplemental report. Amer. Mus. Novitates. 1921, 7 pp. [1958.12.31]
- Philip, C.B. 1958. Descriptions of new Neotropical Tabanidae mostly in the California Academy of Sciences (Diptera). The Pan-Pacific Entomologist 34: 63-76. [1958.06.06]
- Philip, C.B. 1959. Tabanidae (Diptera). Philippine Zoological Expedition 1946-1947. Fieldiana, Zoology 33: 543-625, figs. 99-132. [1959.??.??]
- Philip, C.B. 1959. New North American Tabanidae. X. Notes on synonymy, and description of a new species of Chrysops. Transactions of the American Entomological Society 85: 193-217.
- Philip, C.B. 1960. Further records of neotropical Tabanidae (Diptera) mostly from Peru.Proceedings of the California Academy of Sciences (4) 31: 69-102. [1960.07.08]
- Philip, C.B. 1960. Malaysian parasites XXXV. Descriptions of some Tabanidae (Diptera) from the Far East. Stud. Inst. Med. Res., Fed. Malaysia 29: 1-32. [1960.08.17]
- Philip, C.B. 1960. Malaysian parasites XXXV. Descriptions of some Tabanidae (Diptera) from the Far East. Stud. Inst. Med. Res., Fed. Malaysia 29: 1-32. [1960.08.17]
- Philip, C.B. 1960. New North American Tabanidae. XI. Supplemental notes pertinent to a catalog of Nearctic species. Annals of the Entomological Society of America 53: 364-369. [1960.05.31]
- Philip, C.B. & Mackerras, I.M. 1960. On Asiatic and related Chrysopinae (Diptera: Tabanidae). Philipp, J. Sci. 88 (1959): 279-324
- Philip, C.B. 1961. Three new tabanine flies (Tabanidae, Diptera) from the Orient. Indian J Ent. 21 (1959): 82-88. [1961.??.??]
- Philip, C.B. 1961. Further notes on Far Eastern Tabanidae with description of five new species. Pacif. Insects. 3: 473-479. [1961.??.??]
- Philip, C.B. 1961. Additional records of Tabanidae from the west coast of South America (Diptera). The Pan-Pacific Entomologist 37: 111-116. [1961.06.14]
- Philip, C.B. 1961. New North American Tabanidae. XIII. Change of name for a well-known species of Chrysops. Entomological News 72: 160-162. [1961.06.07]
- Philip, C.B. 1962. A review of the Far Eastern biannularis group of Tabanus. Pacific Insects 4: 293-301. [1962.07.30]
- Philip, C.B. 1962. New North American Tabanidae. XVI. A new species from the South Texas Gulf Coast (Diptera). Proceedings of the Entomological Society of Washington 64: 171-174. [1962.10.17]
- Philip, C.B. & Jones, C.M. 1962. New North American Tabanidae. XV. Additions to records of Chrysops in Florida. Florida Entomologist 45: 67-69.
- Philip, C.B. 1963. Further notes on Far Eastern Tabanidae. II. Descriptions of two new chrysopine flies. Pacific Insects 5: 1-3. [1963.04.30]
- Philip, C.B. 1963. Further notes on Far Eastern Tabanidae. III. Records and new species of Haematopota and a new Chrysops from Malaysia. Pacific Insects 5(3): 519-534. [1963.10.15]
- Philip, C.B. 1965. The identity and relationships of Tabanus (Neotabanus) vittiger and notes on two cases of teratology in Tabanidae (Diptera). Annals of the Entomological Society of America 58(6): 876-880.
- Philip, C.B. 1966. New North American Tabanidae. XVIII. New species and addenda to a Nearctic catalog. Annals of the Entomological Society of America 59(3): 519-527.
- Philip, C.B. 1967. Species of Tabanus related to T. xanthogaster Philippi in Chile. Journal of Medical Entomology 4: 463-466.
- Philip, C.B. 1968. Descriptions of new Neotropical Tabanidae and new records for Argentina. Acta Zoologica Lilloana 22[1967]: 105-132. [1968.11.18]
- Philip, C.B. 1968. New North American Tabanidae. XIX. Four new species from Mexico, Honduras, and Arizona. Annals of the Entomological Society of America 61: 380-383.
- Philip, C.B. 1969. New or little known Neotropical Tabanidae (Diptera). The Pan-Pacific Entomologist 45: 137-152.
- Philip, C.B. 1970. Further notes on Oriental Tabanidae (Diptera) IV. Descriptions of Cydistomyia and Tabanus, and other records, particularly from India and Sikkim. pp. 443–452.. In Singh, K. S. & Tandan, B. K. (eds), H. D. Srivastava Commemoration Volume, 653 pp. Indian Veterinary Research Institute, Division of Parasitology, Izatnagar. [1970.??.??]
- Philip, C.B. 1972. A new Tabanus from South Inida (Dipt., Tabanidae). Entomologica Scandinavica 3: 159-160.
- Philip, C.B. 1973. Diptera: Tabanidae from Ceylon. Entomologica Scandinavica (Suppl.) 4: 56-62.
- Philip, C.B. 1974. Further notes on Oriental Tabanidae (Diptera). 5. New species from southeast Asia. J. Med. Entomol. 11: 393-396.
- Philip, C.B. 1976. Horse-flies, too, take some victims in cold-blood, as on Galapagos Isles. The Pan Pacific Entomologist 52:1 84-88.
- Philip, C.B. 1977. New North American Tabanidae (Diptera). 23. Additional new Diachlorini from Mexico. Proceedings of the Entomological Society of Washington 79: 28-32. [1977.01.24]
- Philip, C.B. 1978. New North American Tabanidae (Diptera). XXV. The genus Hybomitra and some other new tabanine horse flies in Mexico. The Pan-Pacific Entomologist 54: 107-124. [1978.??.??]
- Philip, C.B. 1978. New North American Tabanidae (Insecta: Diptera). XXIV. Further comments on certain Pangoniinae in Mexico with special reference to Esenbeckia.Proceedings of the California Academy of Sciences (4) 41: 345-356. [1978.??.??]
- Philip, C.B. 1979. Further notes on Far Eastern Tabanidae (Diptera). VI. New and little-known species from the Orient and additional records, particularly from Malaysia. Pacific Insects 21: 179-202. [1979.12.21]
- Philip, C.B. 1980. Further notes on Far Eastern Tabanidae VII. New generalized Oriental species of unusual zoogeographic interest (Diptera). The Pan-Pacific Entomologist 56: 71-78. [1980.??.??]
- Philip, C.B. 1983. A unique divergent developmental dependence of a Galapagos horse fly (Diptera, Tabanidae). The Wasmann Journal of Biology 41(1-2): 47-49.
