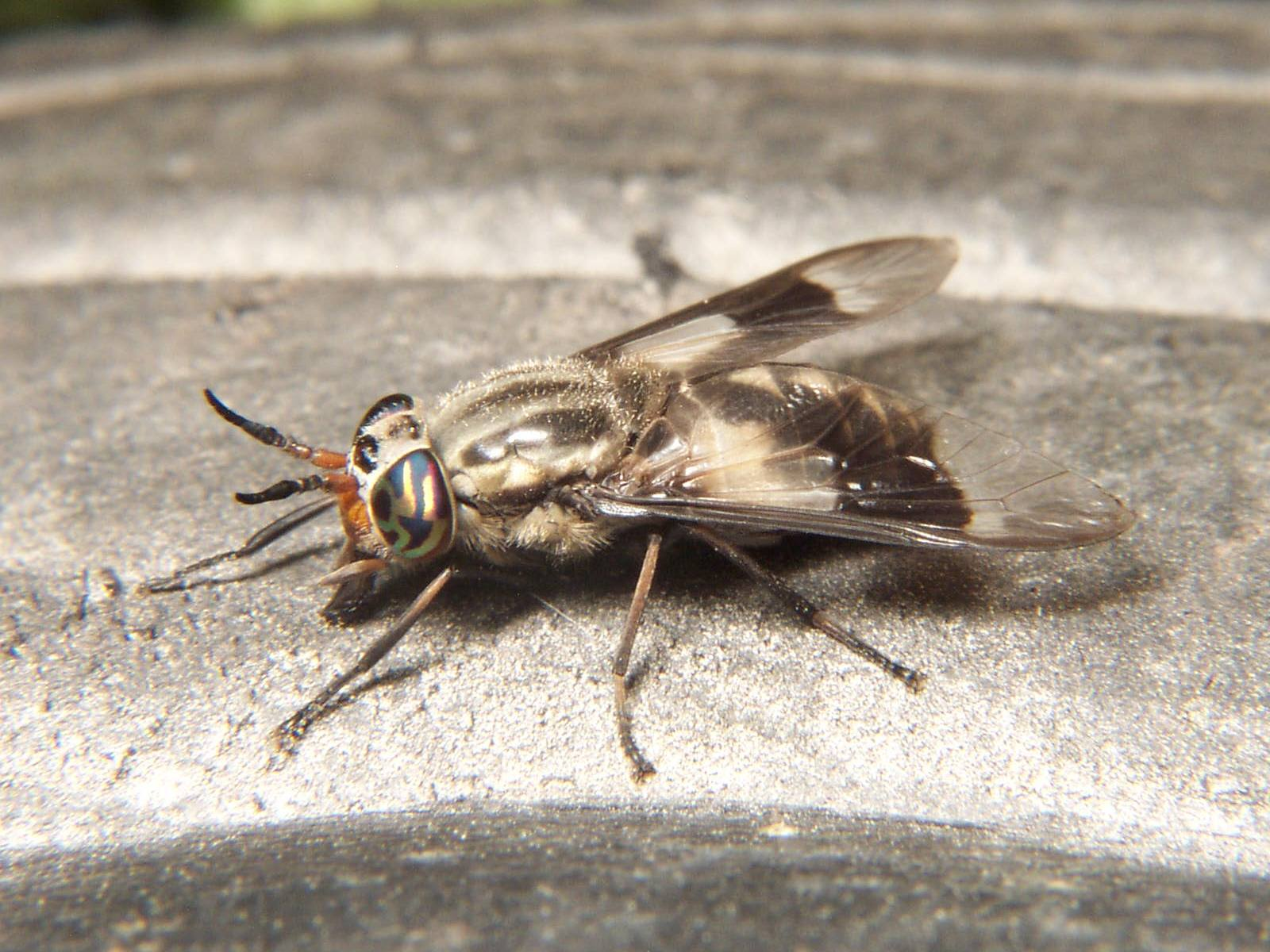
- Chrysops callidus

Scientific classification
- Domain: Eukaryota
- Kingdom: Animalia
- Phylum: Arthropoda
- Class: Insecta
- Order: Diptera
- Family: Tabanidae
- Subfamily: Chrysopsinae
- Tribe: Chrysopsini; Enderlein, 1922

Synonyms
- Silviini Enderlein, 1922

= Chrysopsini =

Tribe of insects

Chrysopsini is a tribe of horse and deer flies in the family Tabanidae.

== Genera ==
- Chrysops Meigen, 1803
- Melissomorpha Ricardo, 1906
- Nemorius Rondani, 1856
- Neochrysops Walton, 1918
- Picromyza Quentin, 1979 (Sometimes placed in Chrysops)
- Silviomyza Philip & Mackerras, 1960
- Silvius Meigen, 1820
- Surcoufia Kröber, 1922
