= Nigar =

Nigar may refer to:

== Given name ==
- Nigar Shaji (born 1964), Indian aerospace engineer
- Nigar Arpadarai (born 1982), Azerbaijani politician and businesswoman
- Nigâr Hanım, Turkish poet
- Nigar Hasan-Zadeh, Azerbaijani poet
- Nigar Jamal, Azerbaijani singer
  - Eldar & Nigar, Azeri pop duo which includes Nigar Jamal
- Nigar Johar, the only female general in Pakistan Army history
- Nigaar Khan, Indian television actress
- Negar Khan, Norwegian-Iranian actress in Indian cinema
- Nigar Nazar, Pakistani cartoonist
- Nigar Rafibeyli, Azerbaijani writer
- Nigar Shikhlinskaya, Azerbaijani nurse
- Nigar Sultana (disambiguation)
  - Nigar Sultana (actress), Indian actress

== Places ==
- Nigar, alternate name of Negar, a city in Iran
- Nigar, alternate name of Negar-e Bala, a village in Iran

== Others ==
- Nigar (magazine), Pakistan-based entertainment magazine
  - Nigar Awards, the oldest Pakistani film awards
- Nigâr, a character in Karagöz and Hacivat plays

== See also ==
- Negar (name), a Persian feminine given name
- Nigga
- Nigger (disambiguation)
- Niger (disambiguation)
- Nigra (disambiguation)
