= Nigor =

Nigor may refer to:

- Negur, a city in Iran, alternatively known as Nigor
- Negar-e Bala, a village in Iran, alternatively known as Nigor

== See also ==
- Niger (disambiguation)
