= C. niger =

C. niger may refer to:

- Cephalophus niger, the black duiker, a forest dwelling mammal species found in the southern parts of Sierra Leone, Liberia, Côte d'Ivoire, Ghana, Benin and Nigeria
- Chelonoidis niger, The Galápagos tortoise or Galápagos giant tortoise (Chelonoidis niger) is a species of very large tortoise in the genus Chelonoidis
- Chiloglanis niger, a catfish species
- Chlidonias niger, the black tern, a small tern generally found in or near inland water in Europe and North America
- Chrysops niger, a fly species
- Cyperus niger, the black flatsedge, a plant species native to the Americas
- Canis niger is an invalid taxon that used to refer to Canis rufus, also known as the Red Wolf.

== See also ==
- Niger (disambiguation)
