= Nuvar =

Nuvar (Persian: نوار) may refer to:

- Nuvar-e Bala
- Nuvar-e Pain
