= M. nigra =

M. nigra may refer to:

== Animals ==
- Macaca nigra, an Old World monkey species that lives in the northeast of the Indonesian island of Sulawesi (Celebes) as well as on smaller neighboring islands
- Melanitta nigra, a large sea duck species

== Plants ==
- Morus nigra, a black colored mulberry species

== See also ==
- Nigra (disambiguation)
