= H. niger =

H. niger may refer to:

- Helleborus niger, the Christmas rose or black hellebore, a plant species
- Hemiargyra niger, a tachinid fly species
- Hyoscyamus niger, the henbane or stinking nightshade, a plant species found in Eurasia
- Hippotragus niger, the sable antelope, a mammal species found in the wooded savannah in East Africa

== See also ==
- Niger (disambiguation)
