= L. niger =

L. niger may refer to:

- Lasius niger, the black garden ant, a formicine ant species found all over Europe
- Lathyrus niger, the black pea, blackening flat pea and black bitter vetch, a perennial legume species native to Europe

== Synonyms ==
- Lablab niger, a synonym for Lablab purpureus, the hyacinth bean, a plant species

== See also ==
- Niger (disambiguation)
