= C. nigra =

C. nigra may refer to:

== Animals ==
- Cardiocondyla nigra, an ant species in the genus Cardiocondyla
- Ciconia nigra, a large wading bird species
- Coracopsis nigra, a black coloured parrot species native to Comoros, Madagascar, Mayotte and Seychelles
- Chelonoidis niger, the largest living species of tortoise, often historically misspelled as "nigra"

== Plants ==
- Carex nigra, a perennial plant species native to wetlands of Europe and Siberia
- Crataegus nigra, a hawthorn species
- Centaurea nigra, a flowering plant species

== See also ==
- Nigra (disambiguation)
