= B. nigra =

B. nigra may refer to:

- Ballota nigra, a perennial herb of the family Lamiaceae
- Betula nigra, a species of birch native to the eastern United States from New Hampshire west to southern Minnesota, and south to northern Florida and east Texas
- Brassica nigra, the black mustard, an annual weedy plant cultivated for its seeds, which are commonly used as a spice

== See also ==
- Nigra (disambiguation)
