= Lobate debris apron =

Geological features on Mars

Lobate debris aprons (LDAs) are geological features on Mars, first seen by the Viking Orbiters, consisting of piles of rock debris below cliffs. These features have a convex topography and a gentle slope from cliffs or escarpments, which suggest flow away from the steep source cliff. In addition, lobate debris aprons can show surface lineations as do rock glaciers on the Earth.

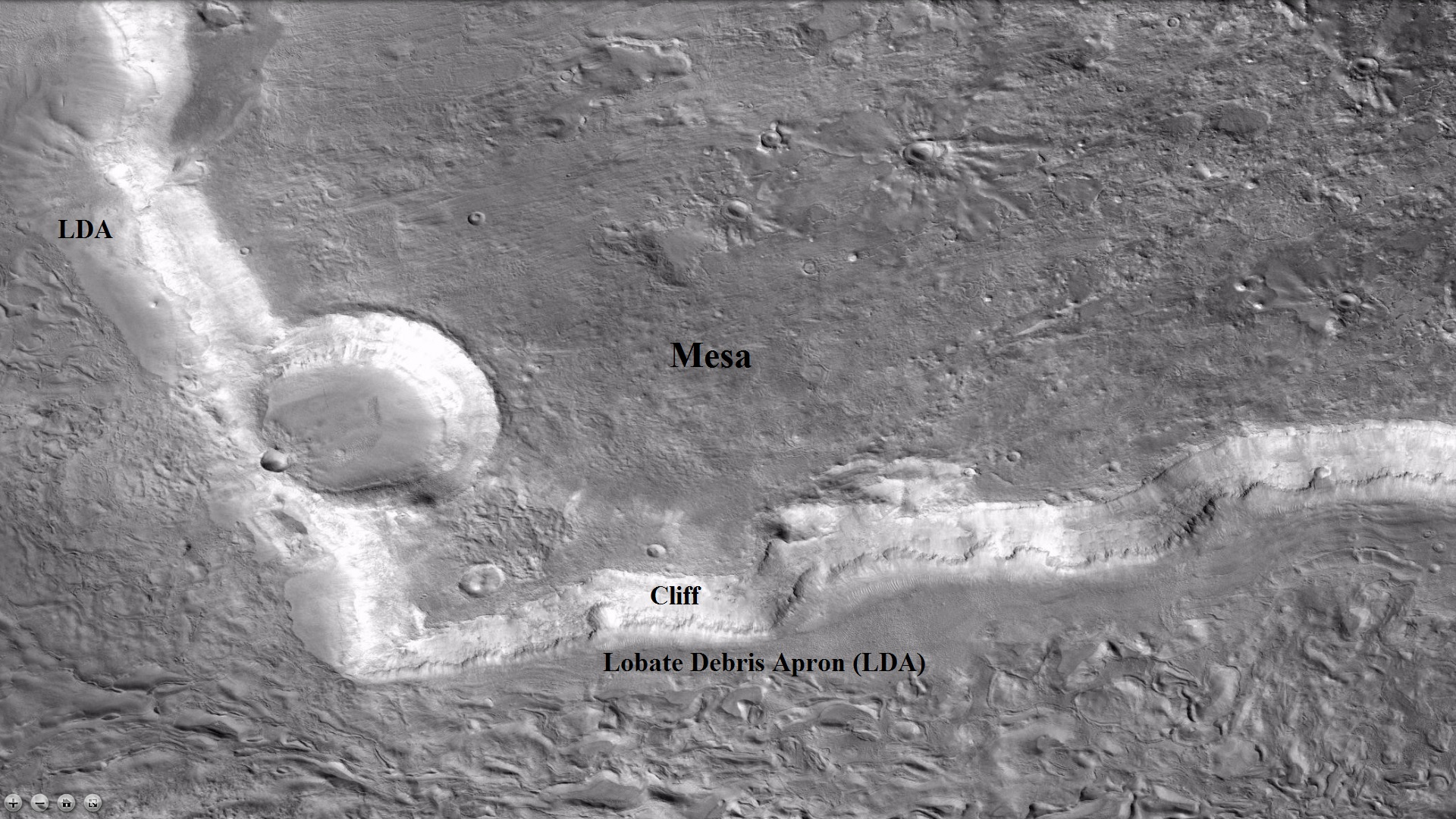
Wide view of mesa with CTX showing cliff face and location of lobate debris apron (LDA) Location is Ismenius Lacus quadrangle.

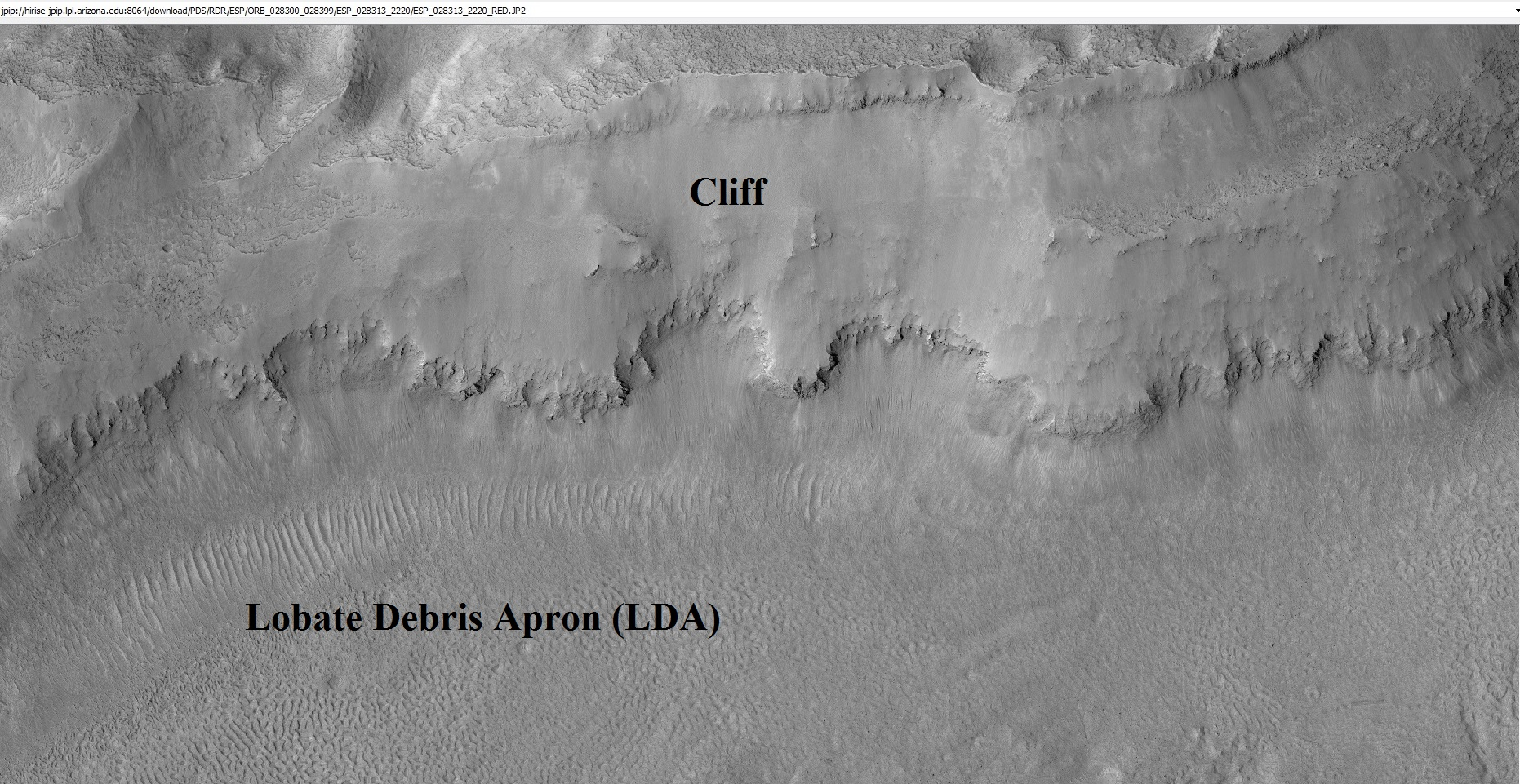
Enlargement of previous CTX image of mesa. This image shows the cliff face and detail in the LDA. Image taken with HiRISE under HiWish program. Location is Ismenius Lacus quadrangle.

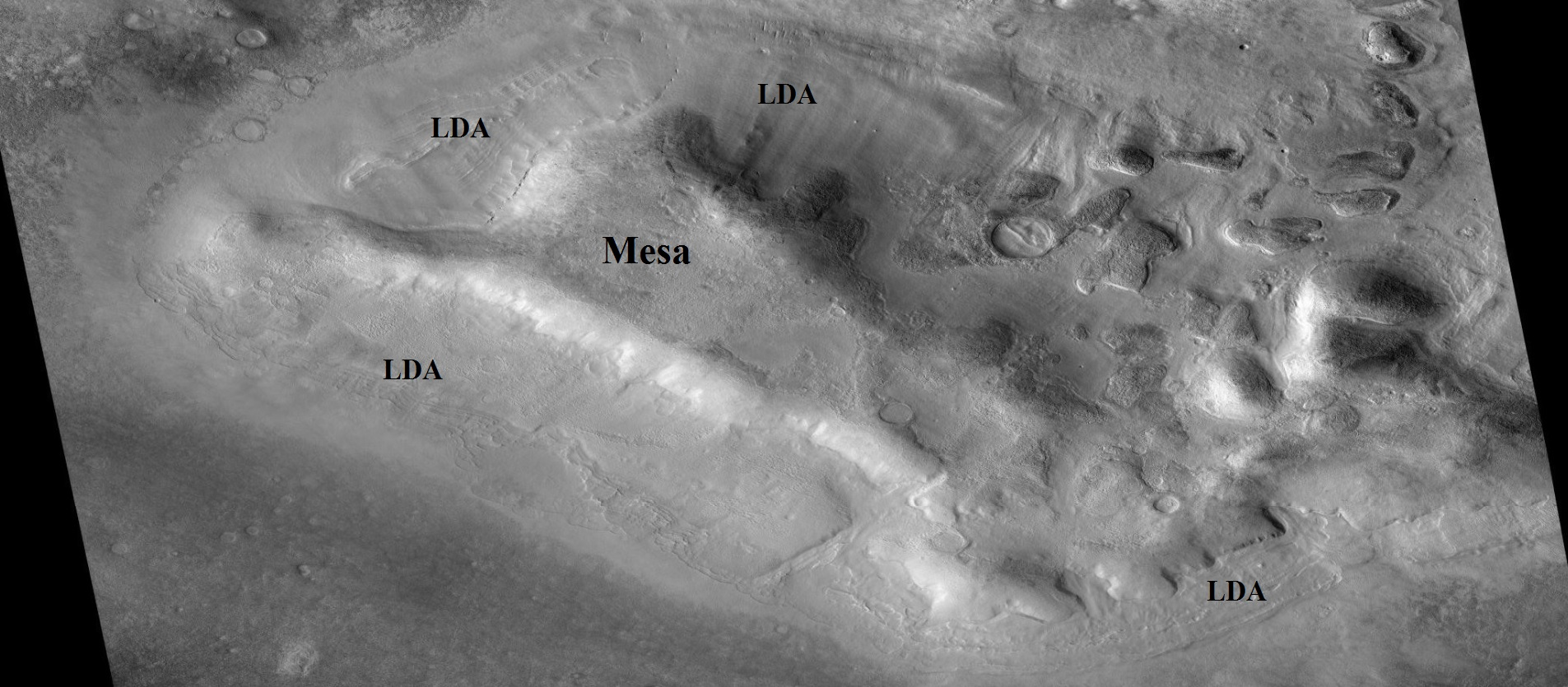
Lobate debris aprons (LDAs) around a mesa, as seen by CTX. Mesa and LDAs are labeled, so one can see their relationship. Radar studies have determined that LDAs contain ice; therefore, these can be important for future colonists of Mars. Location is Ismenius Lacus quadrangle.

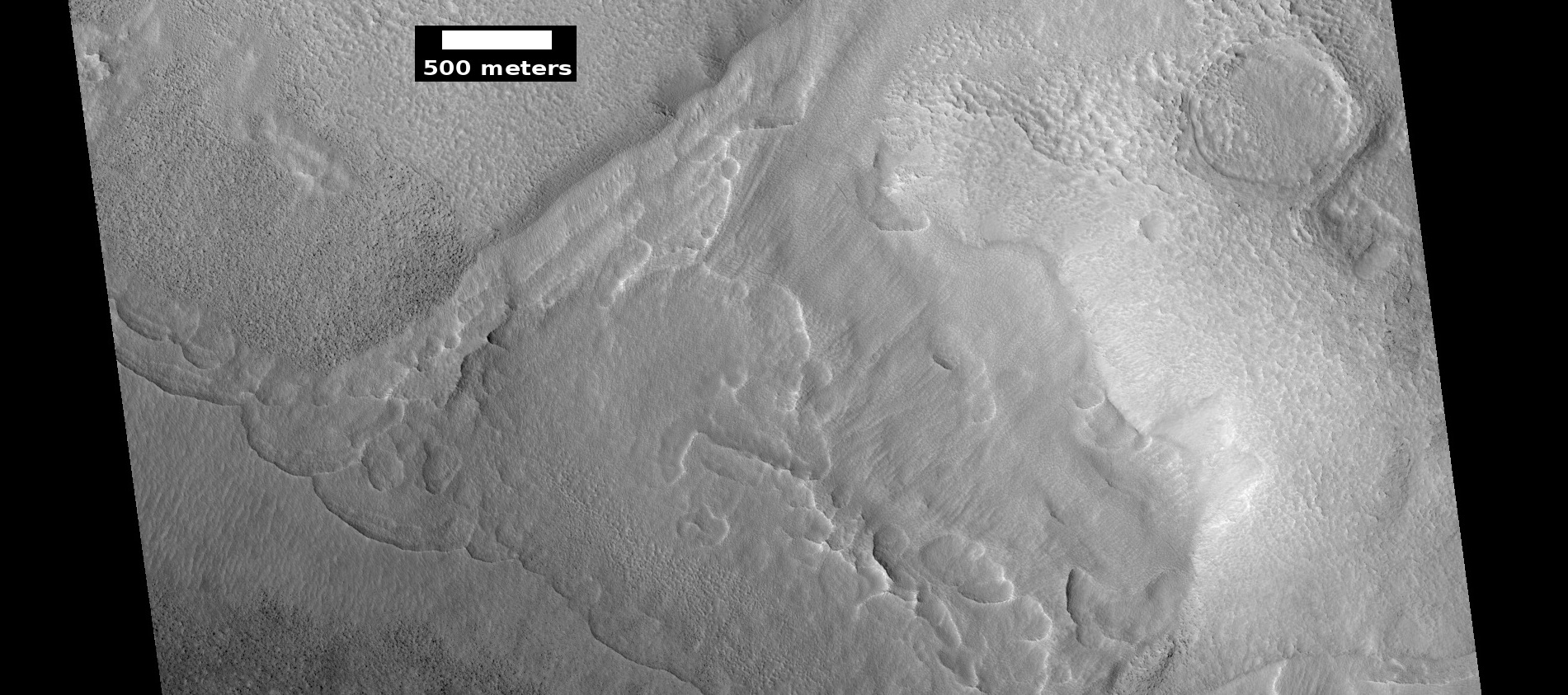
Close-up of lobate debris apron (LDA), as seen by HiRISE under HiWish program

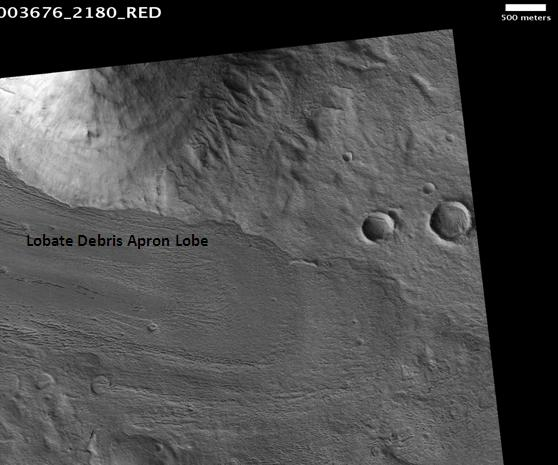
Lobate debris apron in Phlegra Montes, as seen by HiRISE. The debris apron is probably mostly ice with a thin covering of rock debris, so it could be a useful source of water. Scale bar is 500 meters (1,600 feet) long.

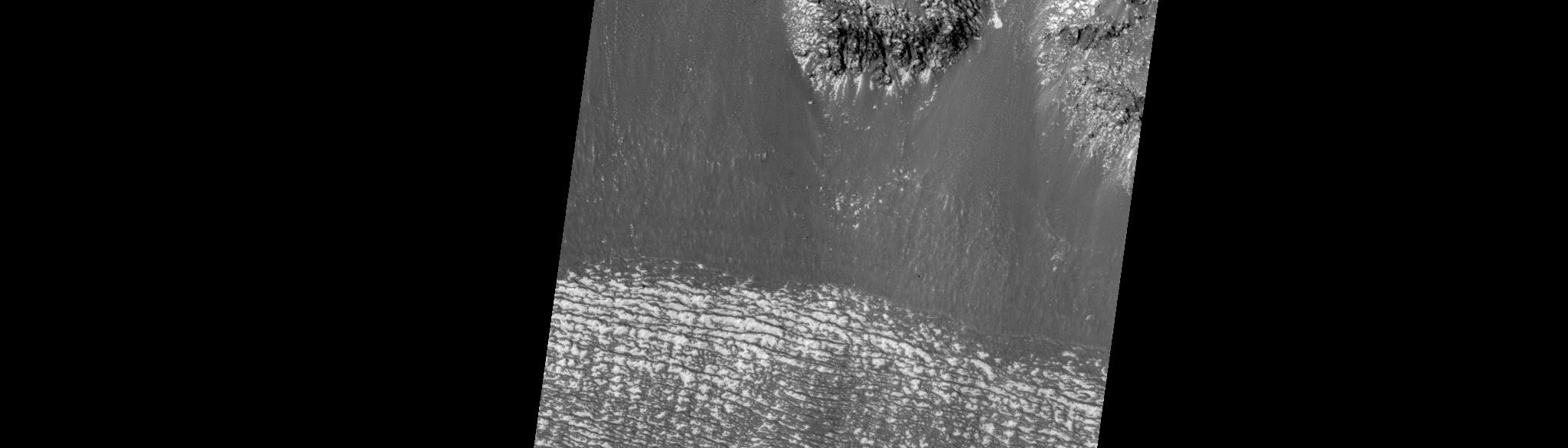
Close-up of surface of a lobate debris apron in Hellas quadrangle. Note the lines that are common in rock glaciers on the Earth.

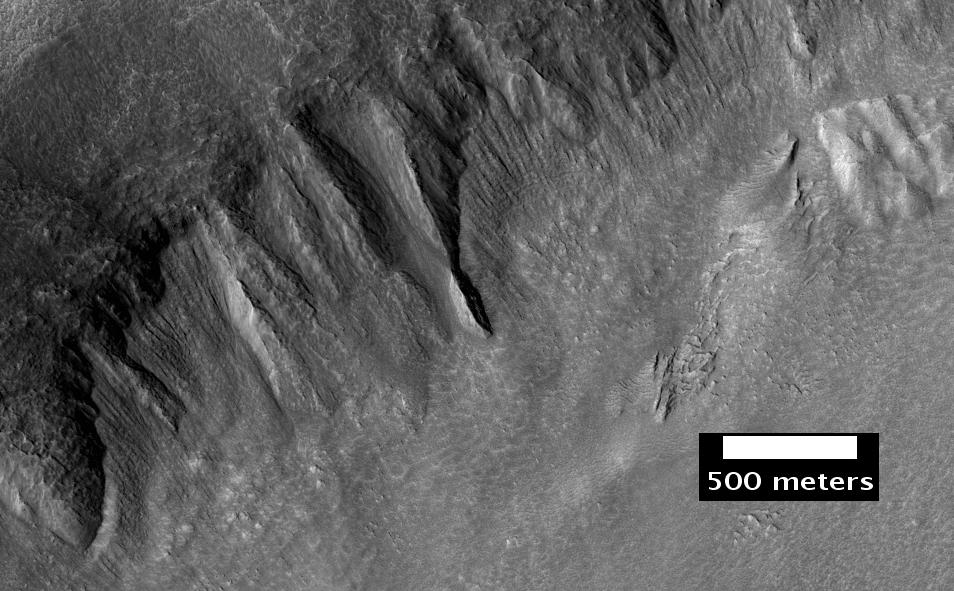
Place where a lobate debris apron begins. Note stripes which indicate movement. Image located in Ismenius Lacus quadrangle.
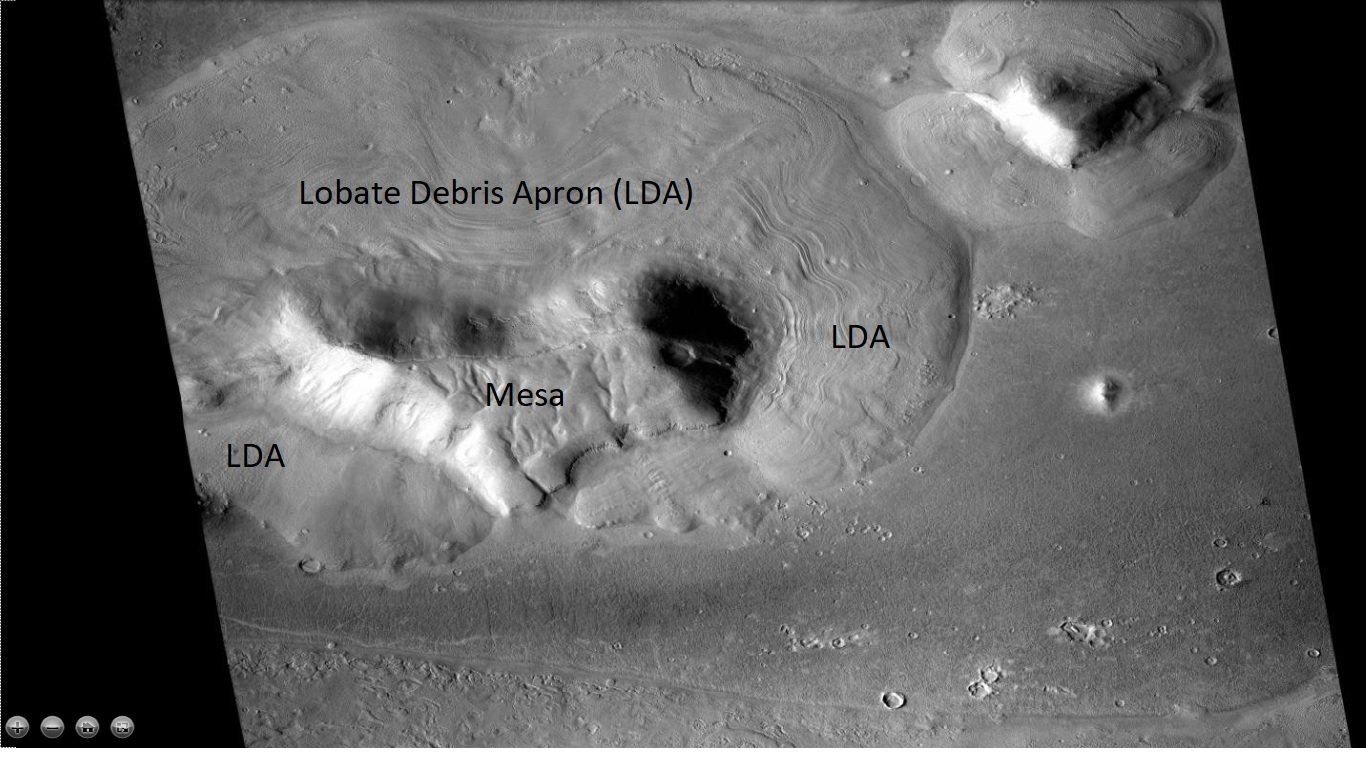
Wide view of mesa with surrounding lobate debris apron, as seen by CTX. Part of this picture is enlarged in the following HiRISE image. Location is the Ismenius Lacus quadrangle.

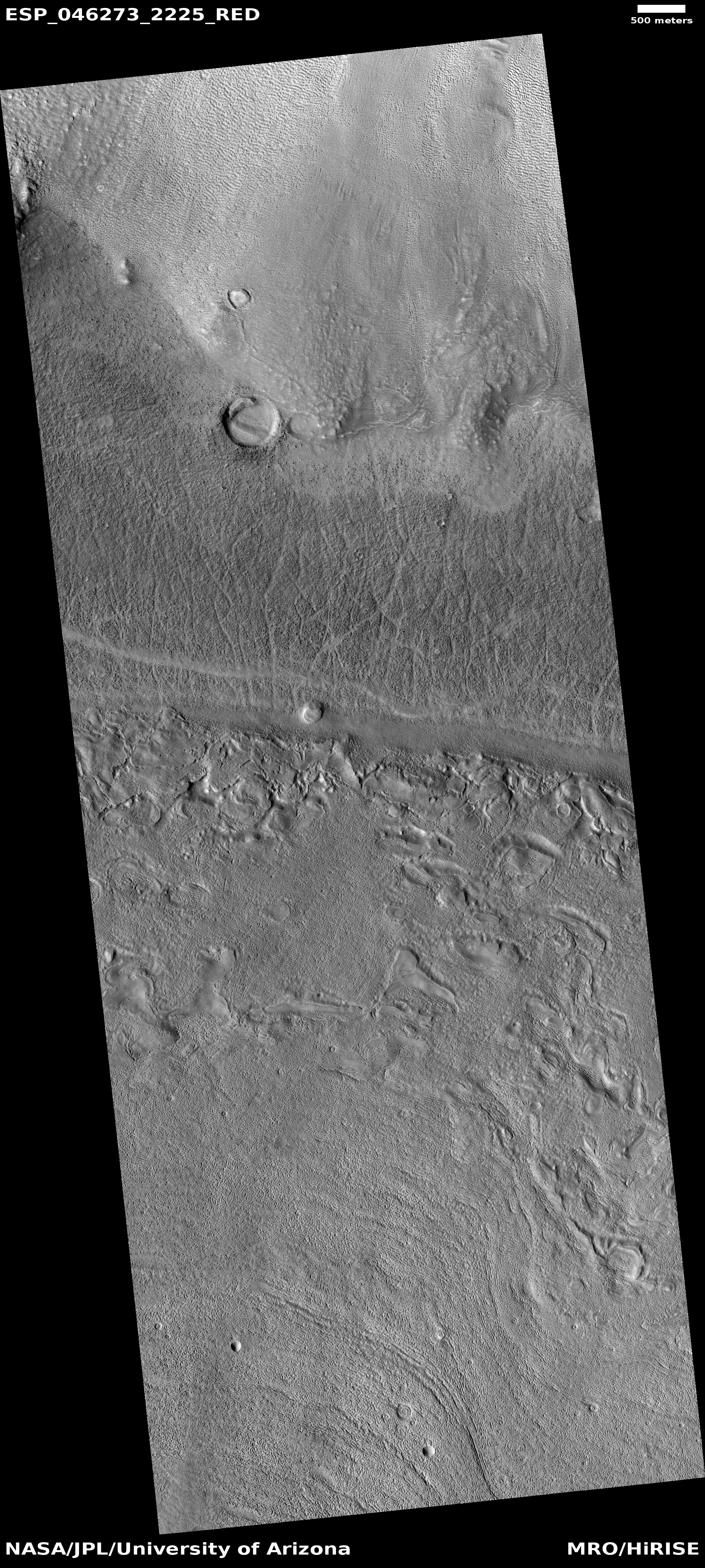
Part of lobate debris apron, as seen by HiRISE under HiWish program This lobate debris apron surrounds a mesa. Location is the Ismenius Lacus quadrangle.

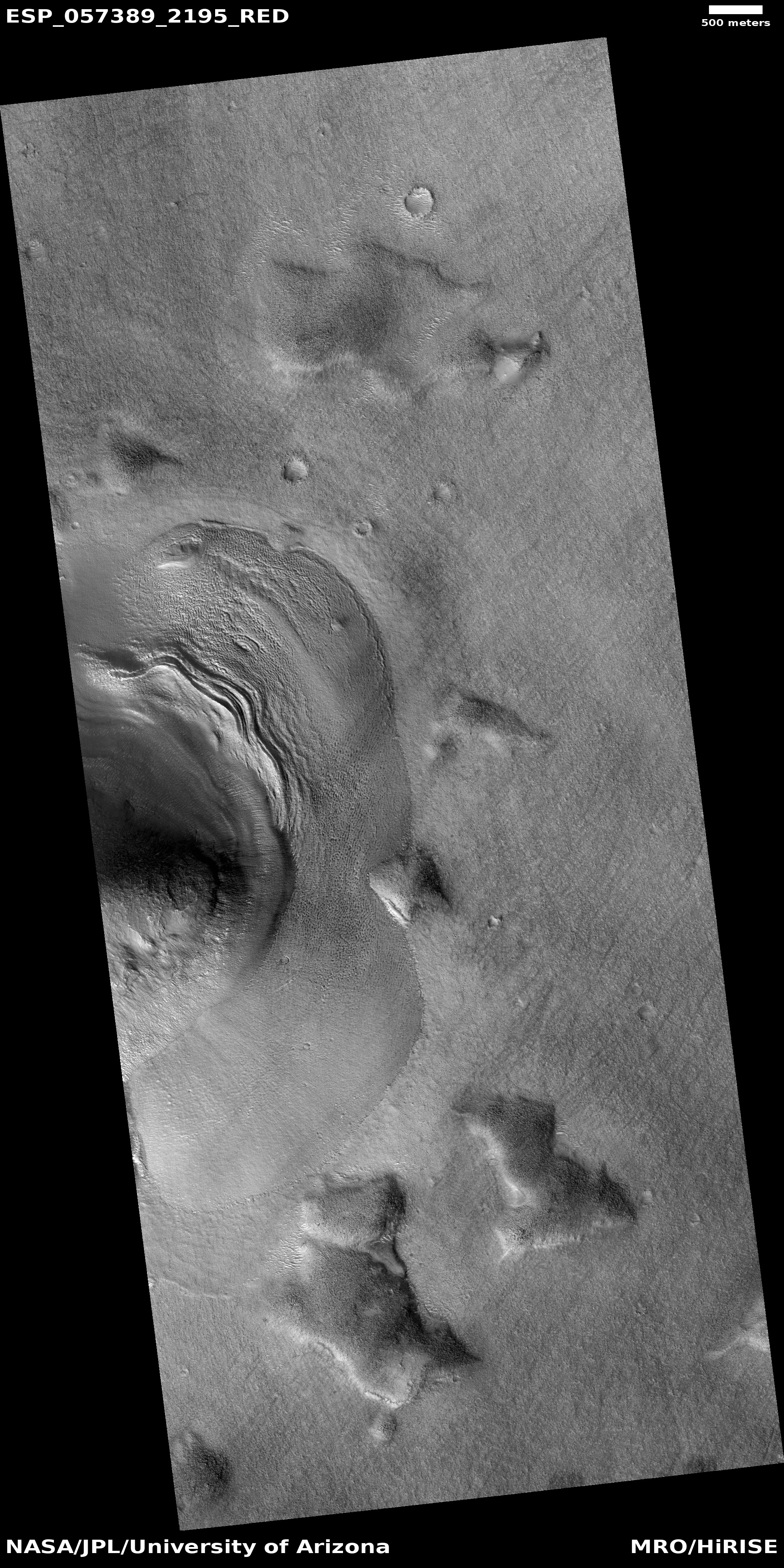
Lobate debris apron around mesa, as seen by HiRISE under HiWish program

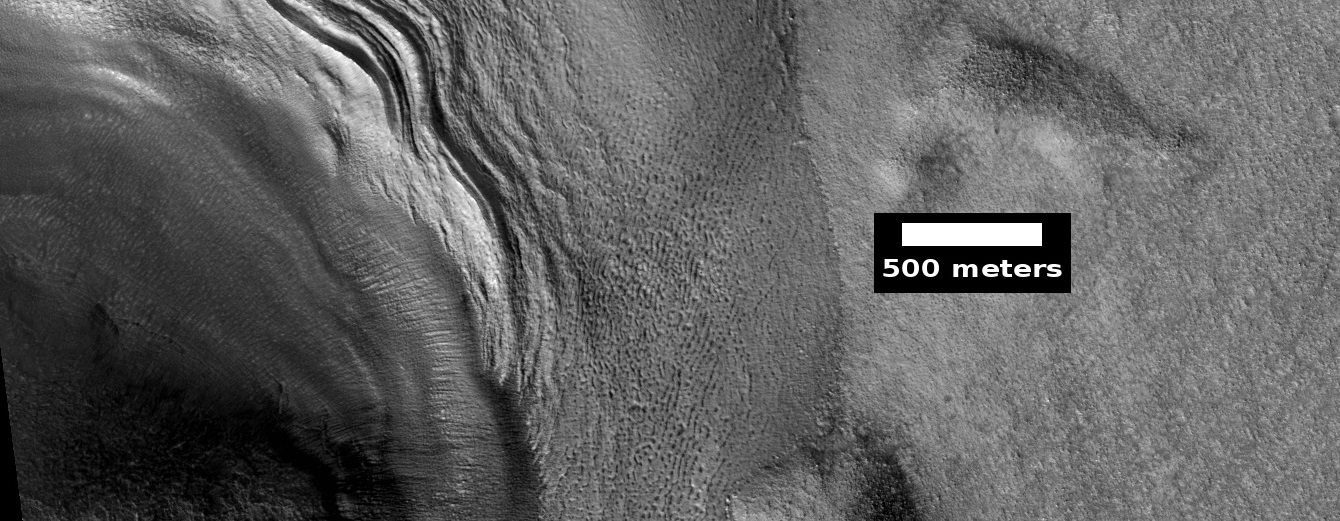
Close view of lobate debris apron around mesa, as seen by HiRISE under HiWish program. Brain terrain is visible.

The Mars Reconnaissance Orbiter's Shallow Radar gave a strong reflection from the top and base of LDAs, meaning that pure water ice made up the bulk of the formation (between the two reflections). This is evidence that the LDAs in Hellas Planitia are glaciers covered with a thin layer of rocks. In addition, radar studies in Deuteronilus Mensae show that all lobate debris aprons examined in that region contain ice.

Analysis of SHARAD data led researchers to conclude that Lobate debris aprons (LDA's) are over 80% pure ice. The paper authors examined five different sites from around the planet and all showed high levels of pure water ice.

Because of the high purity of the ice content that was found, the authors argued that the formation of glaciers happened by atmospheric precipitation or direct condensation. After glaciers were formed there was a time when enhanced sublimation formed a lag layer or promoted the accumulation of dry debris atop the water ice glacier. Those dry debris would then insulate the underlying ice from going away.

The experiments of the Phoenix lander and the studies of the Mars Odyssey from orbit show that frozen water exists just under the surface of Mars in the far north and south (high latitudes). Most of the ice was deposited as snow when the climate was different. The discovery of water ice in LDAs demonstrates that water is found at even lower latitudes. Future colonists on Mars will be able to tap into these ice deposits, instead of having to travel to much higher latitudes. Another major advantage of LDAs over other sources of Martian water is that they can easily be detected and mapped from orbit. Lobate debris aprons are shown below from the Phlegra Montes which are at a latitude of 38.2 degrees north. The Phoenix lander set down at about 68 degrees north latitude, so the discovery of water ice in LDAs greatly expands the range of water easily available on Mars. It is far easier to land a spaceship near the equator of Mars, so the closer water is available to the equator, the better it will be for colonists.

== Lineated floor deposits ==
The floors of some channels show ridges and grooves that seem to flow around obstacles; these features are called lineated floor deposits or lineated valley fill (LVF). Like lobate debris aprons, they are believed to be ice-rich. Some glaciers on the Earth show such features.

It has been suggested that lineated floor deposits began as LDAs. By tracing the paths of the curved ridges characteristic of LDAs, researchers have come to believe that they straighten out to form the ridges of LVF. Both lineated floor deposits and lobate debris aprons often display a strange surface formation called brain terrain because it looks like the surface of the human brain.

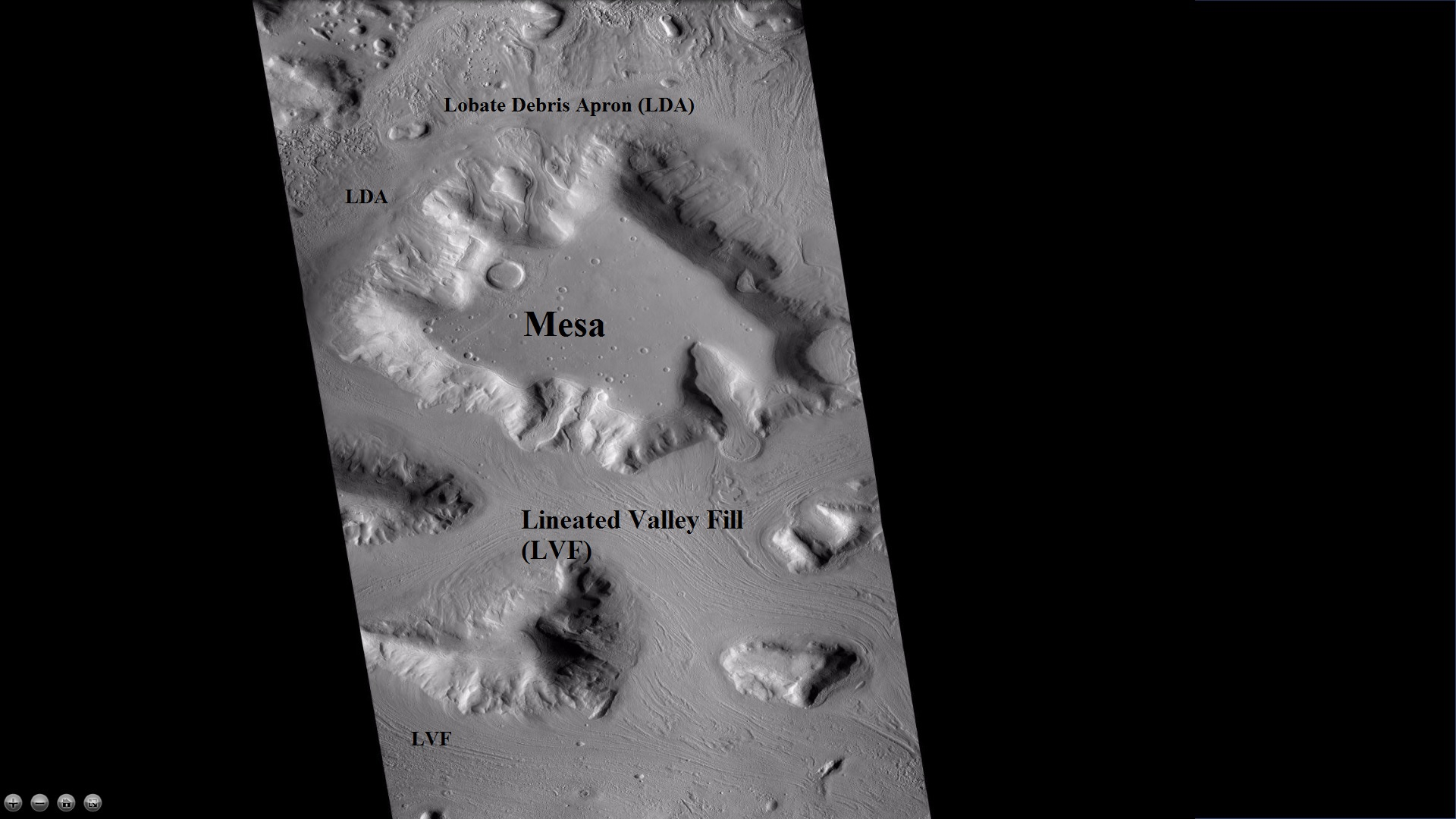
Wide CTX view showing mesa and buttes with lobate debris aprons and lineated valley fill around them. Location is Ismenius Lacus quadrangle.

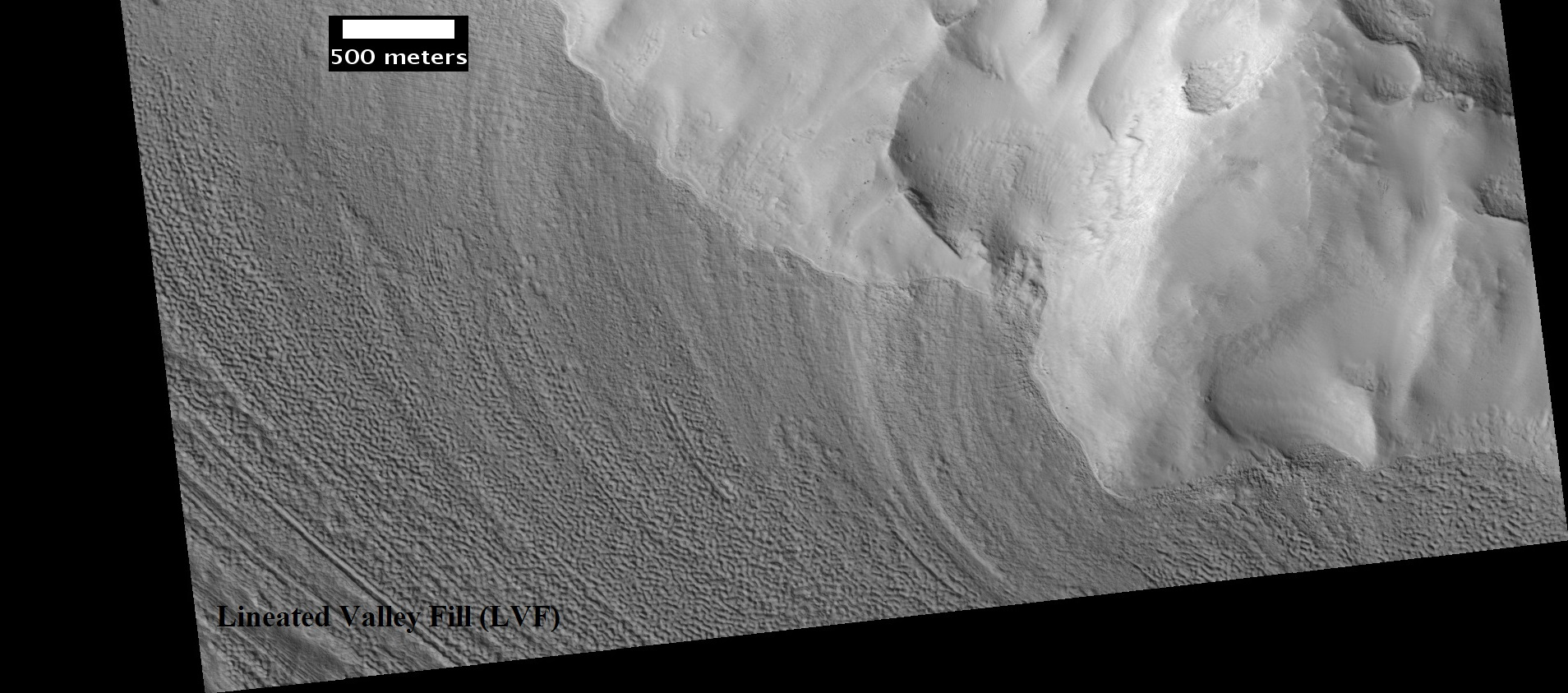
Close-up of lineated valley fill (LVF), as seen by HiRISE under HiWish program. This is an enlargement of the previous CTX image.

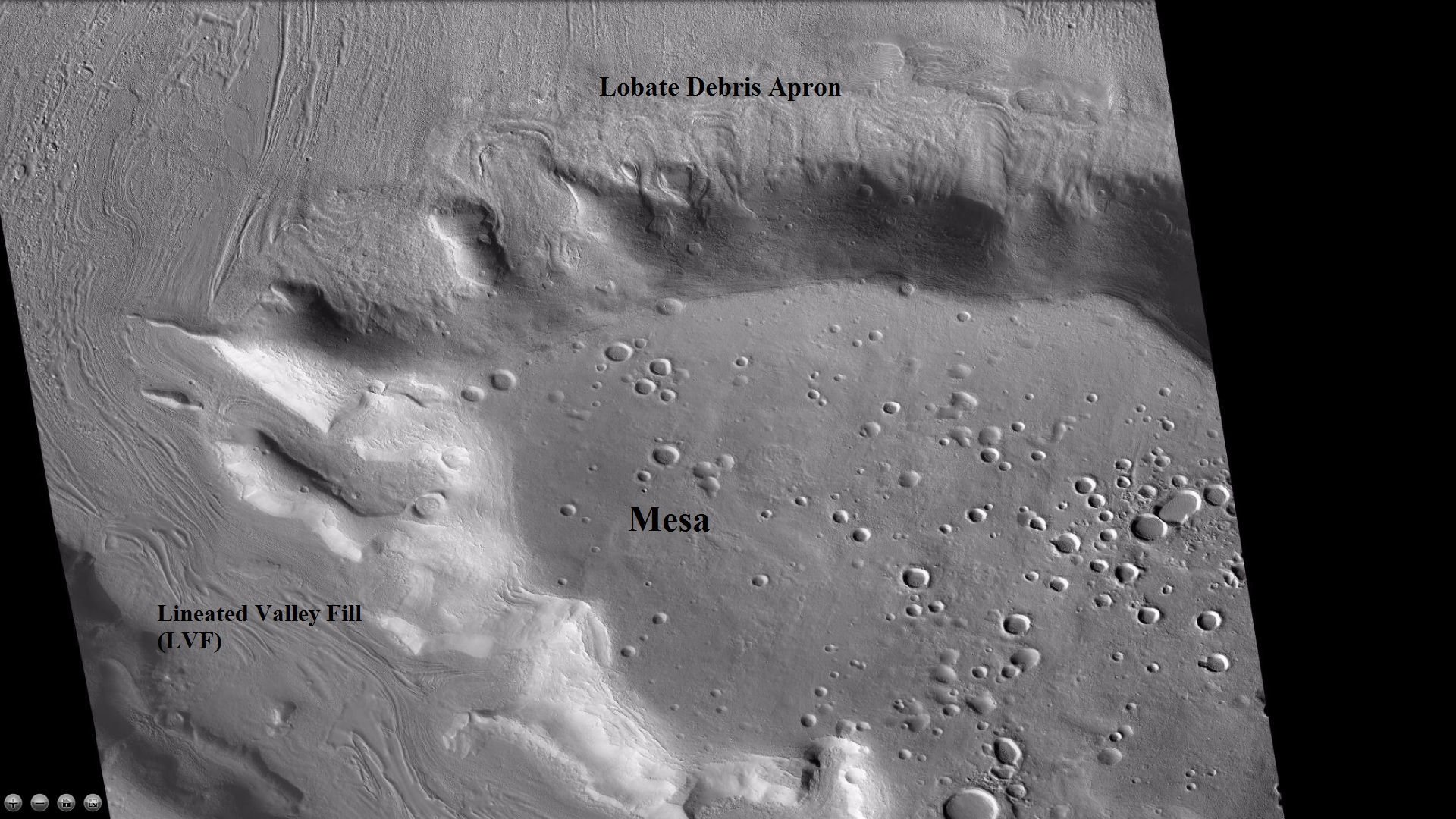
Wide CTX view of mesa showing lineated valley fill and lobate debris apron (LDA). Both are believed to be debris-covered glaciers. Location is Ismenius Lacus quadrangle.

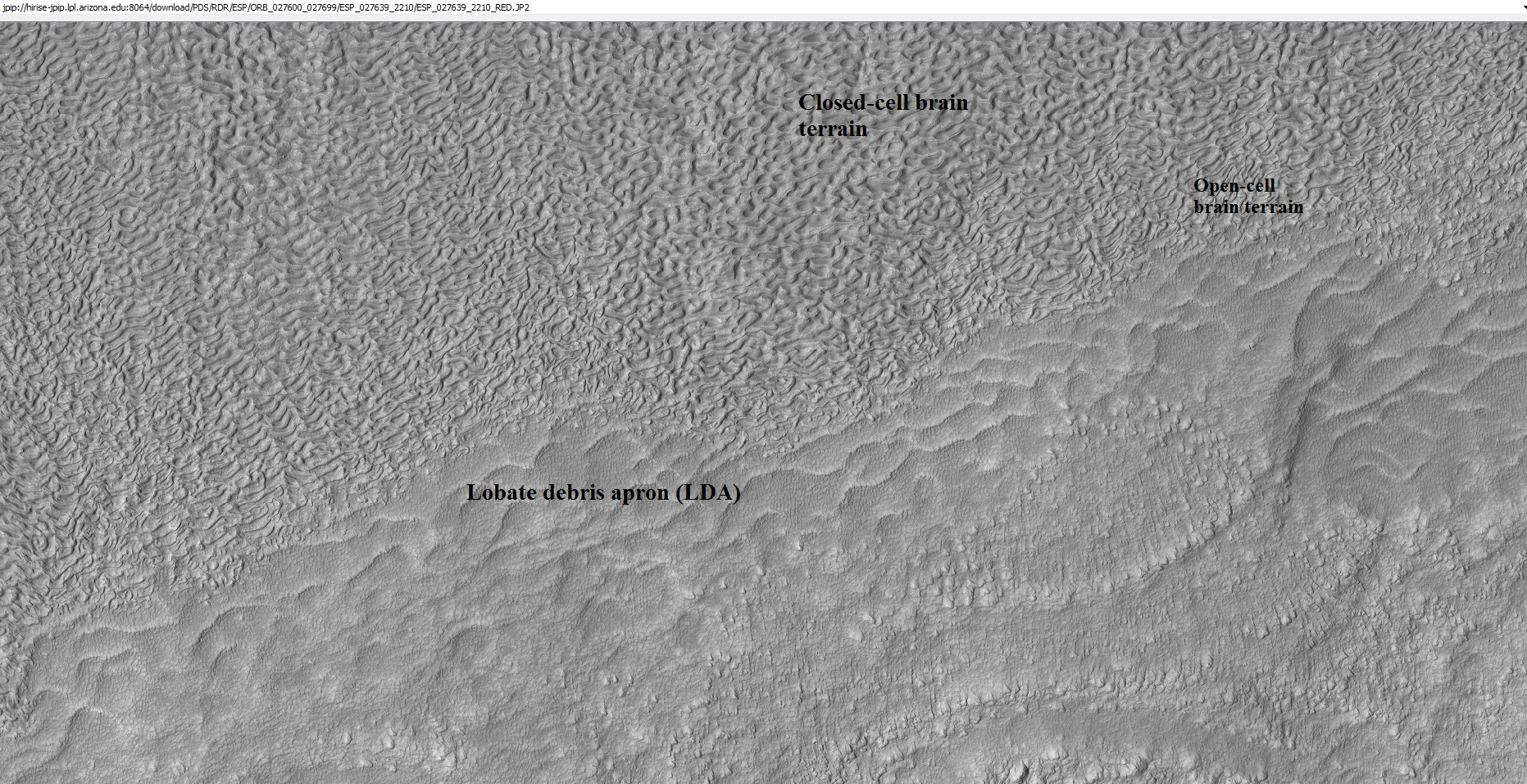
Close-up of lobate debris apron from the previous CTX image of a mesa. Image shows open-cell brain terrain and closed-cell brain terrain, which is more common. Open-cell brain terrain is thought to hold a core of ice. Image is from HiRISE under HiWish program.

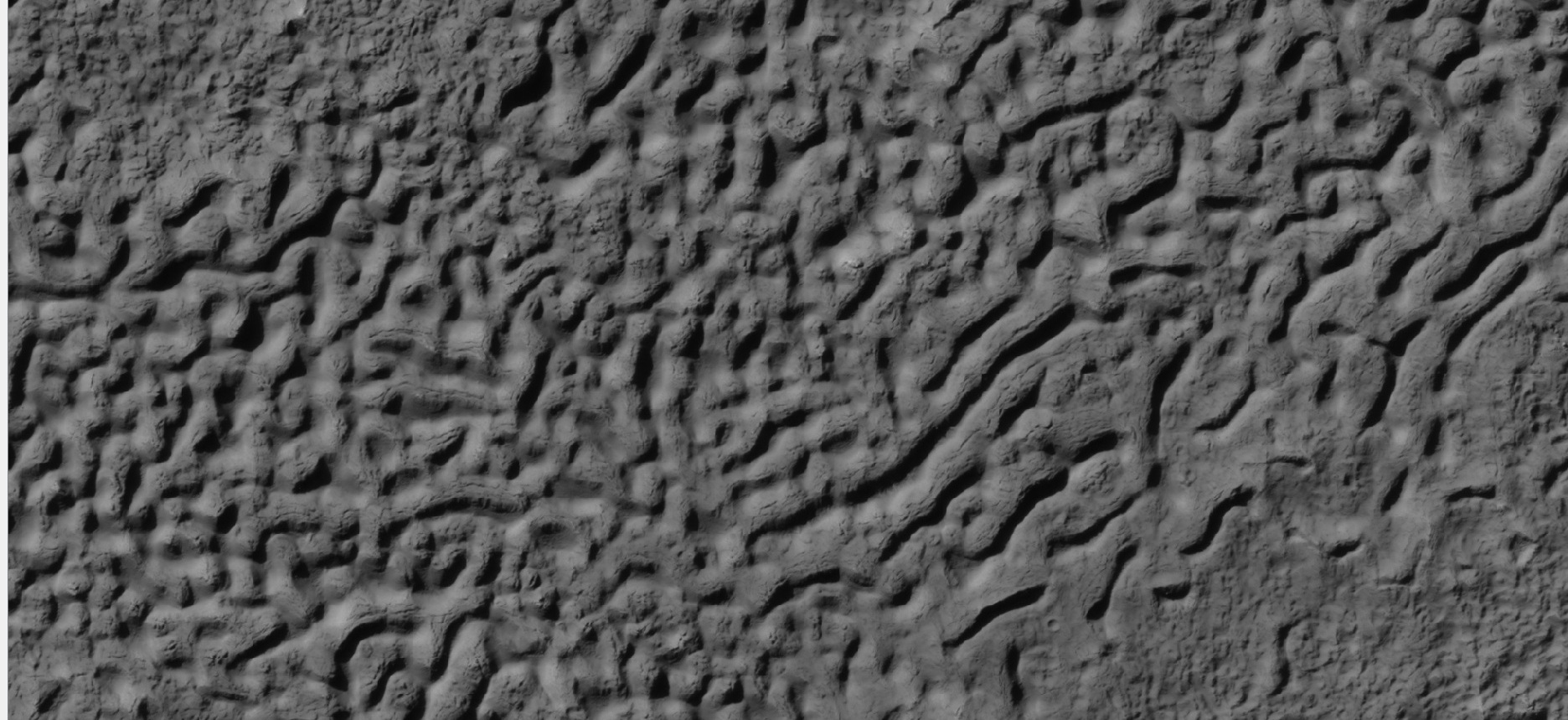
Closed-cell brain terrain, as seen by HiRISE under the HiWish program. This type of surface is common on lobate debris aprons, concentric crater fill, and lineated valley fill.

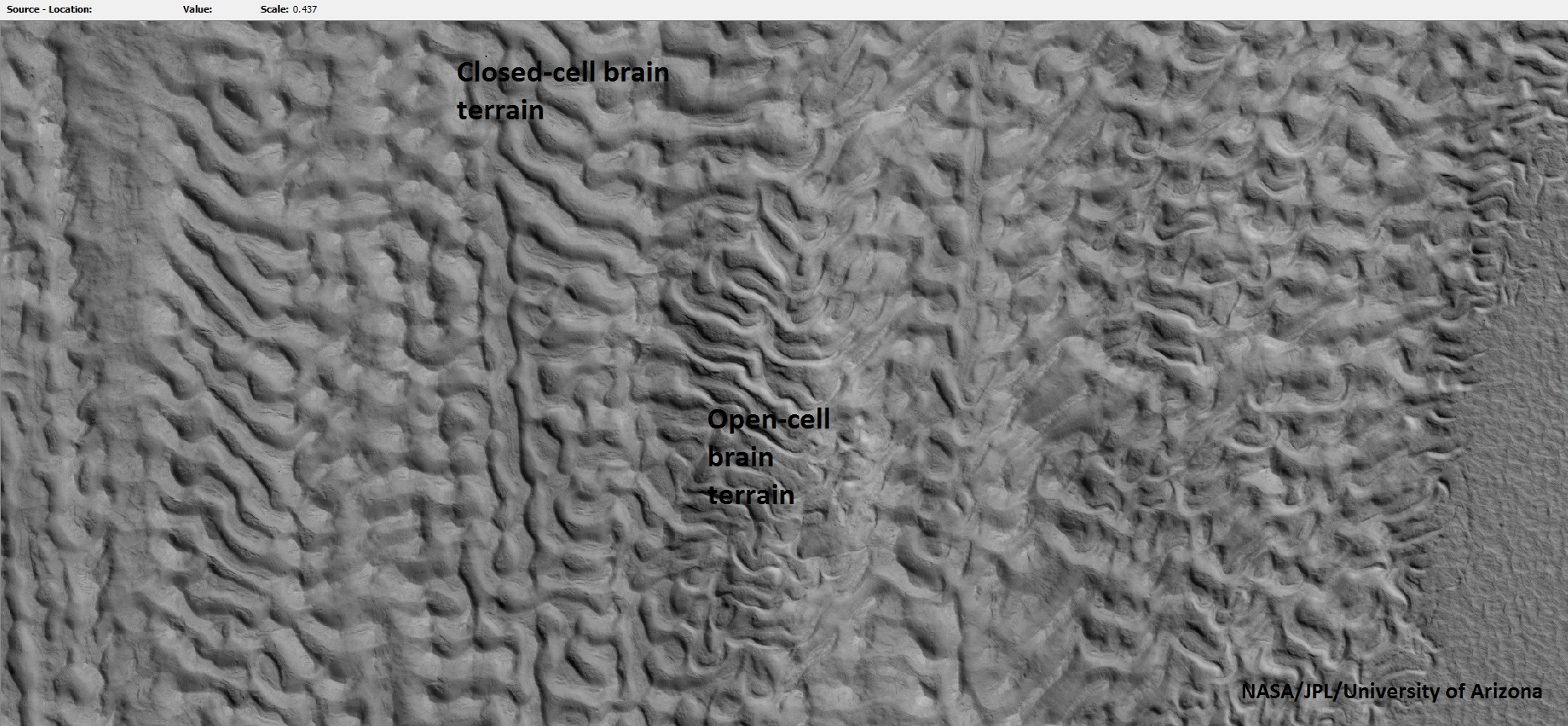
Open and closed-cell brain terrain, as seen by HiRISE, under HiWish program.

Reull Vallis, pictured below, displays these deposits. Sometimes the lineated floor deposits show a chevron pattern, which is further evidence of movement. The picture below taken with HiRISE of Reull Vallis shows these patterns.

== Recent observations ==
Recent analyses of the Nereidum Montes (~35–45°S, ~300–330°E), and Phlegra Montes (NNE–SSW, between latitudes 30–52°N) mountain ranges of Mars have revealed terrains rich in viscous flow features (VFFs), a cyro-geomorphological group of which lobate debris aprons are a sub-class. In a 2014 study, 11,000 VFFs have been recorded between 40° and 60° in northern and southern latitudes, with a 2020 study identifying approximately 3,348 VFFs in the Nereidum Montes range. These LDAs were more extensive and older VFF features (hundreds of Ma) in the range, with the vast majority located in impact craters and surrounding massifs.

Water-ice to lithic ratios of 9:1 were recorded for LDAs by the Mars Reconnaissance Orbiter (MRO), with Berman's 2020 study presenting Nereidum Montes as possibly containing more water-ice rich LDAs, than other locations in the mid-latitude band. Studies have estimated that LDAs could reach from tens of meters up to 390 meters (1,280 feet) in thickness, with anywhere from 1 to 10 meters (3.3 to 32.8 feet) of overlying regolith preventing sublimation. Late Amazonian glaciation may have occurred in the mid-latitudes due to water-ice emplacement from higher latitudes. This glaciation may have occurred during high obliquity periods in Mars past. Some of these LDAs are overlain with another class of viscous ice flows that is smaller, and younger (tens of Ma) called glacial-like flows (GLFs). Some 320 of these superposed GLFs (SGLFs) have been found, implying successive glaciation periods.

The datasets utilized in these studies included MRO Context Camera (CTX; ~5–6 m/pixel), High-Resolution Imaging Science Experiment (HiRISE) (~25 cm/pixel) images, MRO Shallow Radar (SHARAD), 128 pixel/degree (~463 m/pixel) Mars Global Surveyor (MGS), Mars Orbiter Laser Altimeter (MOLA), Digital Elevation Modelling (DEM), 100 m/pixel THEMIS Day and Night IR mosaics, and the GIS-based (ESRI ArcGIS Desktop) software.

Lobate debris aprons (LDA's) and lineated valley fill (LVF) are now thought to be the same – mostly ice with a covering of debris, their shapes are dependent on their locations. When confined within a valley, LVF is present; in contrast when not confined, this flowing debris covered ice forms LDA's.

== More images of glaciers ==
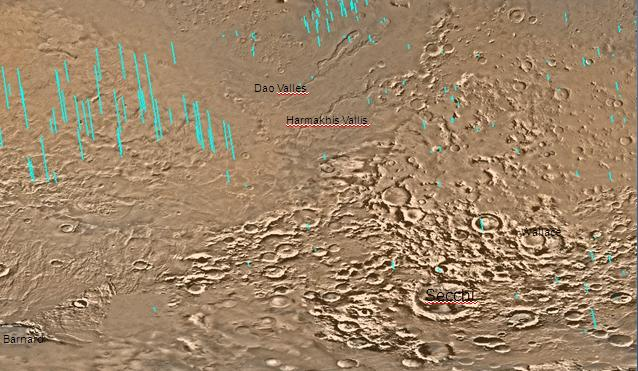
Map of the eastern part of Hellas Planitia (a vast impact crater), showing two large river valleys that slope left, toward the floor of the crater.

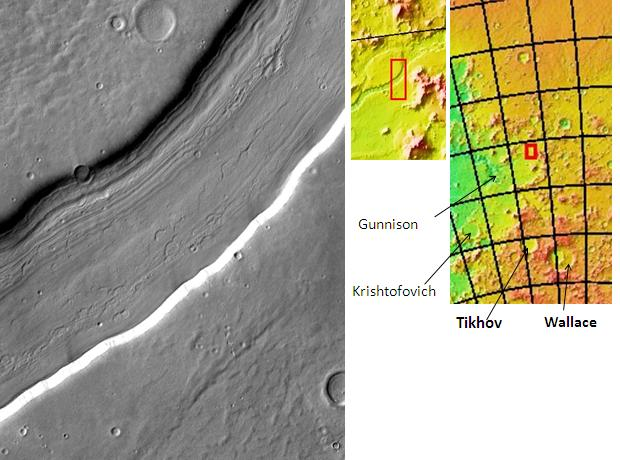
Reull Vallis with lineated floor deposits, as seen by THEMIS. Click on image to see relationship to other features.

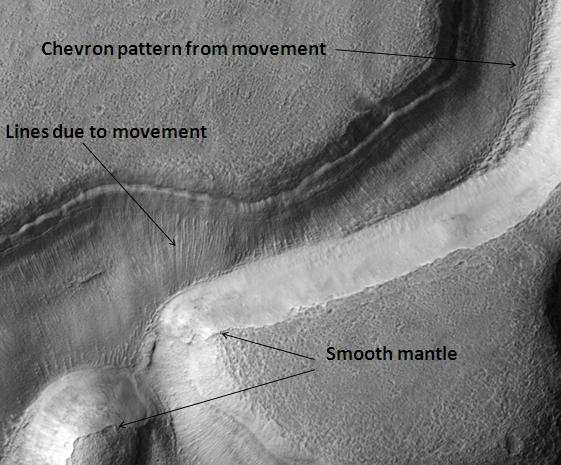
Niger Vallis with features typical of this latitude, as seen by HiRISE. Chevron pattern results from movement of ice-rich material. Click on image to see chevron pattern and mantle.

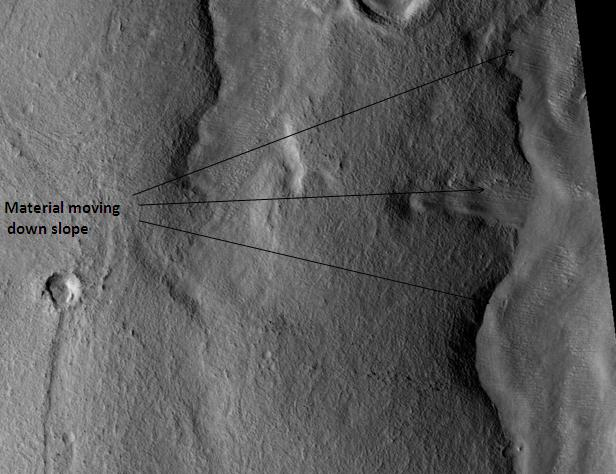
Material moving down slope in Phlegra Montes, as seen by HiRISE. Movement is probably aided by water/ice.

== See also ==
- Climate of Mars
- Deuteronilus Mensae
- Fretted terrain
- Geology of Mars
- Glaciers on Mars
- Lineated valley fill
- Martian dichotomy
- Nilosyrtis Mensae
- Protonilus Mensae
- Water on Mars
