= Reull Vallis =

Valley on Mars which appears to have been carved by water

- Coordinates: 42.6°S 255.9°W
- Length: 945.0
- Naming: Word for "planet" in Gaelic

Reull Vallis is a valley on Mars that appears to have been carved by water. It runs westward into Hellas Planitia. It is named after the Gaelic word for planet. It is found in the Hellas quadrangle.

== Lineated Floor Deposits ==
On the floors of some channels are features called lineated floor deposits. They are ridged and grooved materials that seem to deflect around obstacles. They are believed to be ice-rich. Some glaciers on the Earth show such features. Lineated floor deposits may be related to lobate debris aprons, which have been proven to contain large amounts of ice. Reull Vallis, as pictured below, displays these deposits.

== Gallery ==
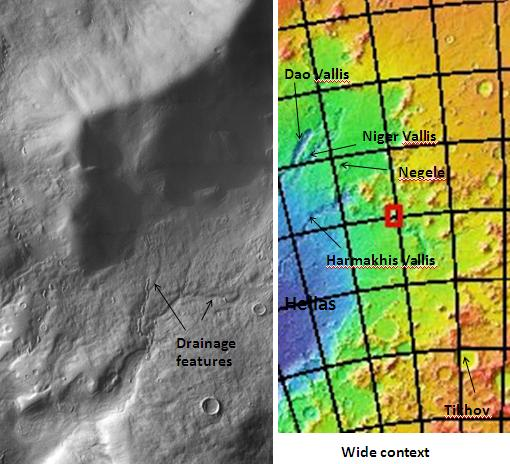
Drainage features in Reull Vallis, as seen by THEMIS. Click on image to see relationship of Reull Vallis to other features.

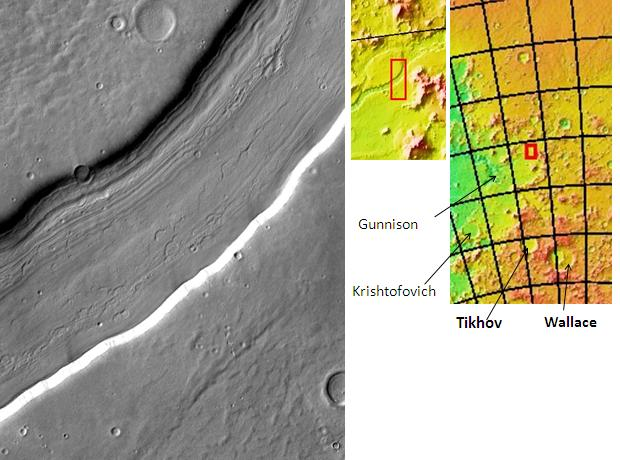
Reull Vallis with lineated floor deposits, as seen by THEMIS. Click on image to see relationship to other features.

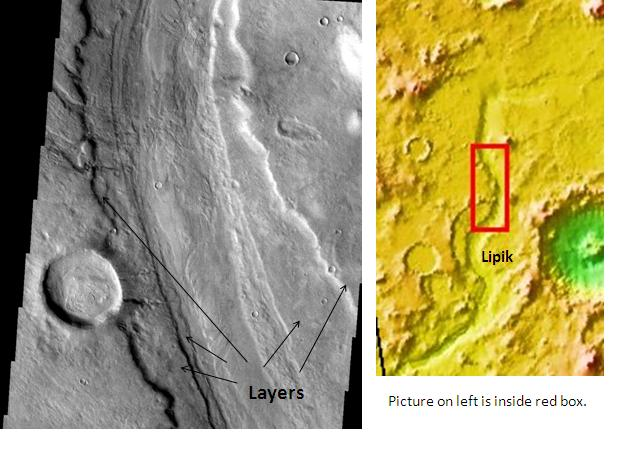
Layers in Reull Vallis, as seen by THEMIS.

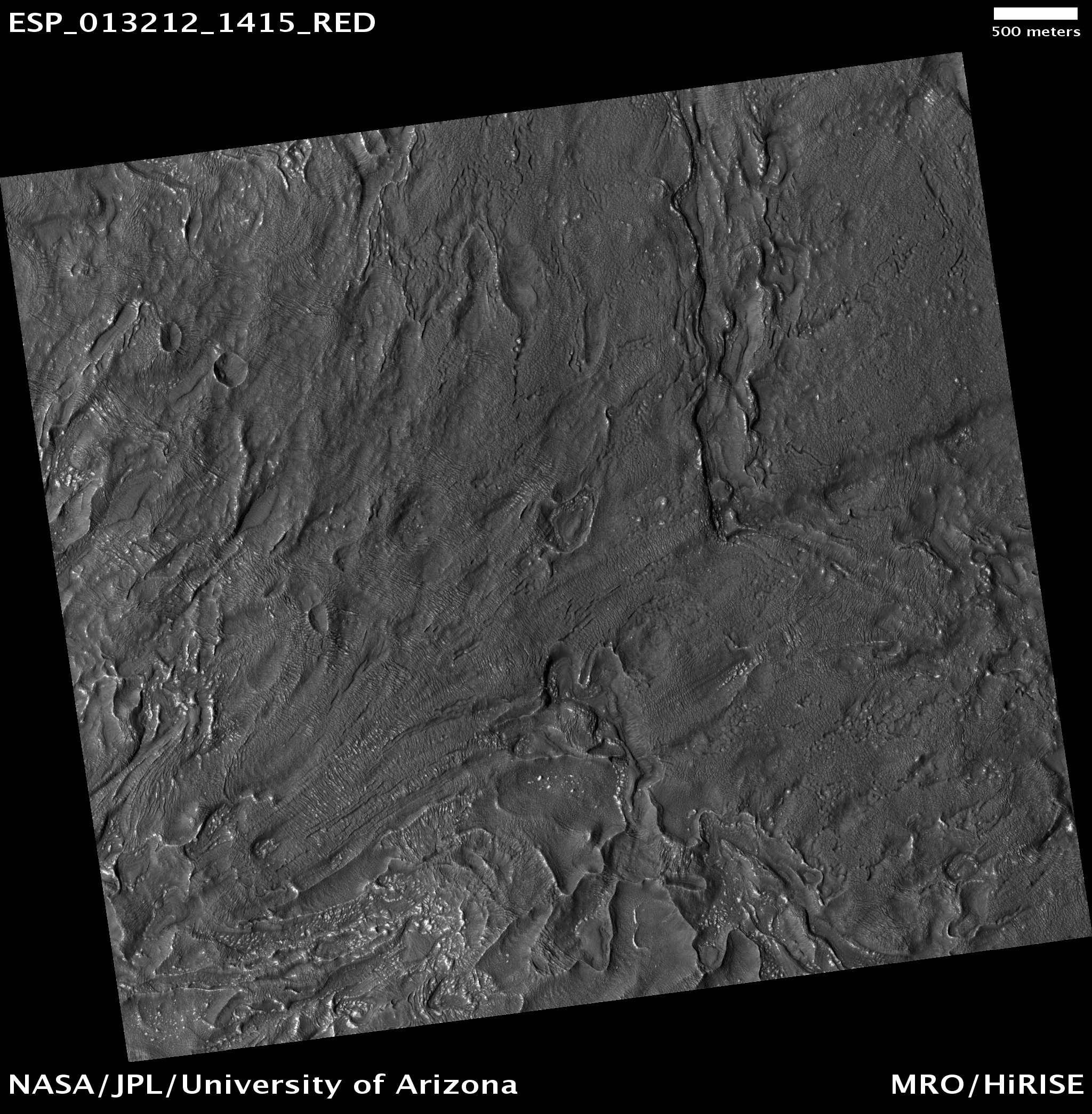
Fretted terrain near Reull Vallis, as seen by HiRISE.

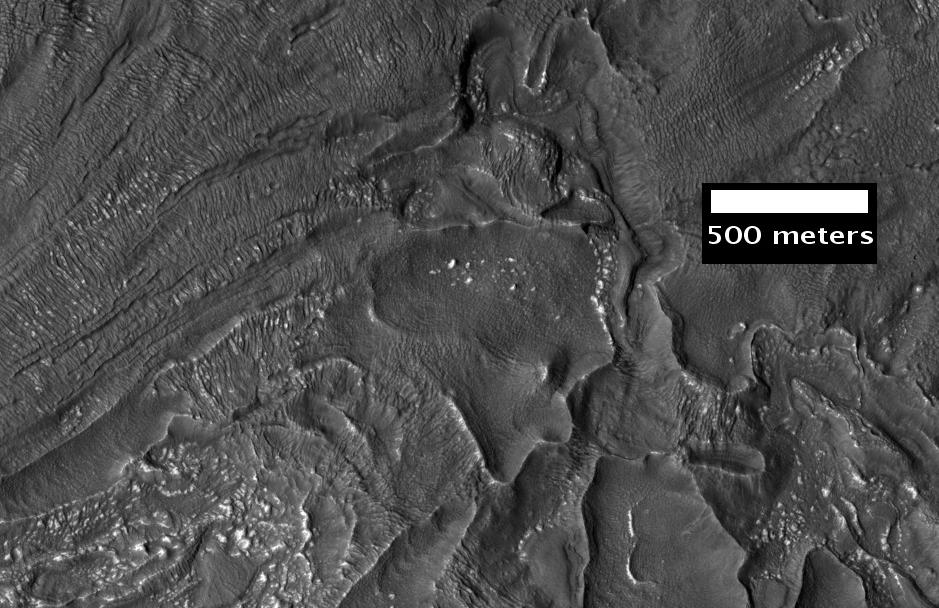
Close-up of fretted terrain near Reull Vallis, as seen by HiRISE. This area would be a challenge to walk across.

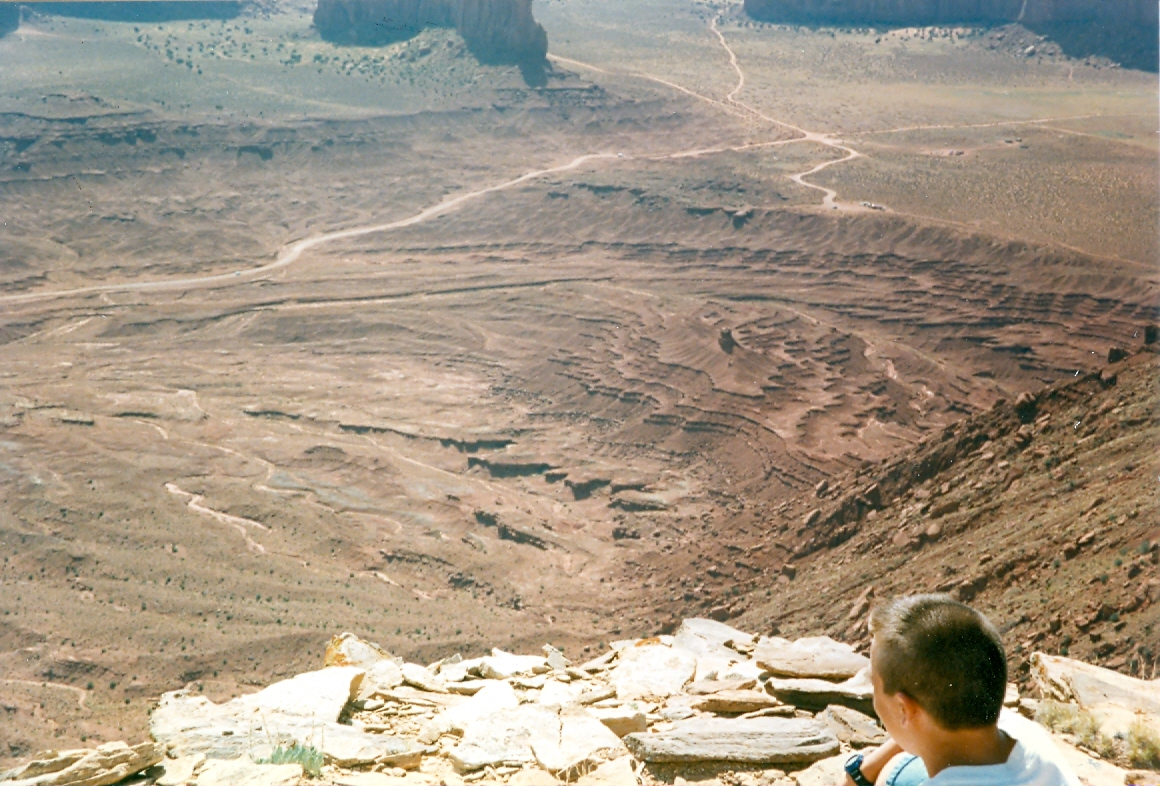
Layers in Monument Valley, Utah. These are accepted as being formed, at least in part, by water deposition. Since Mars contains similar layers, water remains as a major cause of layering on Mars.

== See also ==
- Dao Vallis
- Harmakhis Vallis
