= Nigeria (disambiguation) =

Nigeria is a country in West Africa.

Nigeria or Nigerian may also refer to:

- Nigeria national football team, the national men football team in Nigeria
- Colonial Nigeria, British Colony and protectorate
- Languages of Nigeria, languages spoken in Nigeria
- Nigerian cuisine, culinary traditions of Nigeria
- Nigerian Pidgin, English-based creole languages
- 45619 Nigeria, a British LMS Jubilee Class locomotive
- HMS Nigeria, a light cruiser of the Royal Navy completed early in World War II
- NNS Nigeria, an Algerine-class minesweeper of the Nigerian Navy from 1959 to 1962 period
- NNS Nigeria, a frigate of the Nigerian Navy, entering service in 1965
- Nigeria (Grant Green album)
- Nigeria (Oluyemi Thomas album)

== See also ==
- Nigerian scam
- Nigerian American
- Nigerian Breweries, a Nigerian brewing company
- Nigerian Canadians
- Niger (disambiguation)
