= Negar (name) =

Negar or Negâr is a feminine given name of Persian origin meaning "sweetheart, soulmate, idol or beloved." The Persian word also means "pattern and painting".

== Notable people ==
=== Given name ===
- Negar Nikki Amini, Iranian-born Swedish marketer
- Negar Assari, painter, photographer, sculptor, and graphic artist
- Negar Bouban, Iranian musician
- Négar Djavadi, Iranian-French novelist, screenwriter and filmmaker
- Negar Esmaeili, Iranian taekwondo practitioner
- Negar Foroozandeh, Iranian actress
- Negar Javaherian, Iranian film and theater actress and translator
- Negar Khan, Iranian-born Norwegian actress
- Negar Mortazavi, Iranian-American journalist
- Negar Mottahedeh, cultural critic and film theorist

=== Surname ===
- Shiva Negar, Iranian-Canadian actress and model

== See also ==
- Nigar (disambiguation)
