= Dao Vallis =

Martian valley

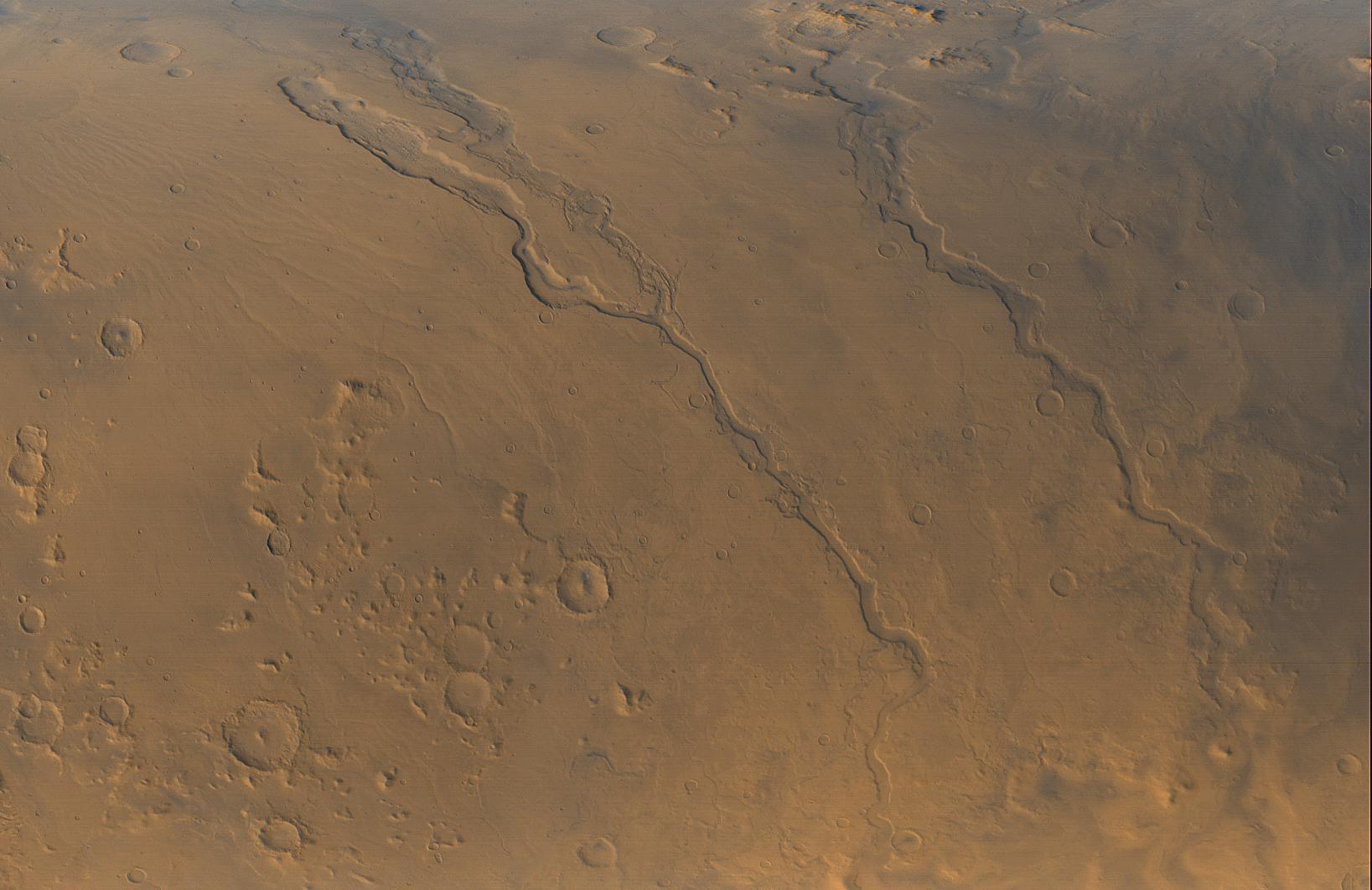
- Dao Vallis is the leftmost channel, joined just above the center of the image by Niger Vallis. In each valley water flowed toward the bottom of the image. The caldera of Hadriacus Mons is at upper left.
- Coordinates: 38.7°S 272.1°W
- Length: 816.0 km
- Naming: Word for "star" in Thai

Dao Vallis is a valley on Mars that appears to have been carved by water. It runs southwestward into Hellas Planitia from the southern slopes of the volcano Hadriacus Mons, and has been identified as an outflow channel. It and its tributary, Niger Vallis, extend for about 1,200 km (750 mi).

It is named after the Thai word for star, and it was proposed as a potential landing site for the 2012 Curiosity rover of the Mars Science Laboratory mission. In the fictional 2007 Canadian miniseries Race to Mars, it is the landing site for Gagarin, the lander.

== Origin ==
Dao Vallis begins near a large volcano, Hadriacus Mons, so it is thought to have received water when hot magma melted huge amounts of ice in the frozen ground. Much of this water may have been released in very large "outburst floods". The partially circular depressions on the left side of the channel in the image below suggests that groundwater sapping also contributed water more gradually.

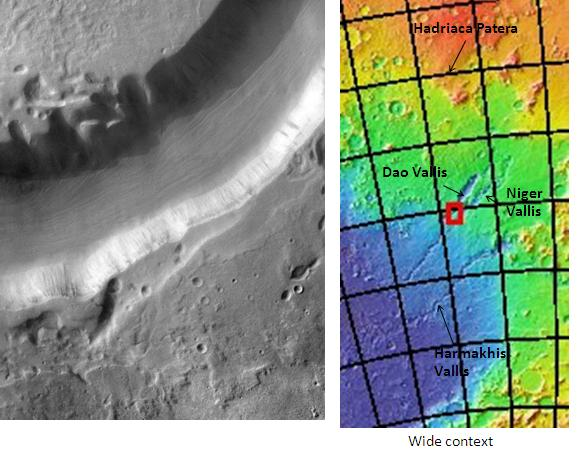
Section of Dao Vallis, as seen by THEMIS. Click on image to see relationship of Dao Vallis to other nearby features.

== See also ==
- Harmakhis Vallis
- Outflow channels
- Reull Vallis
