= Hadriacus Mons =

Martian volcano

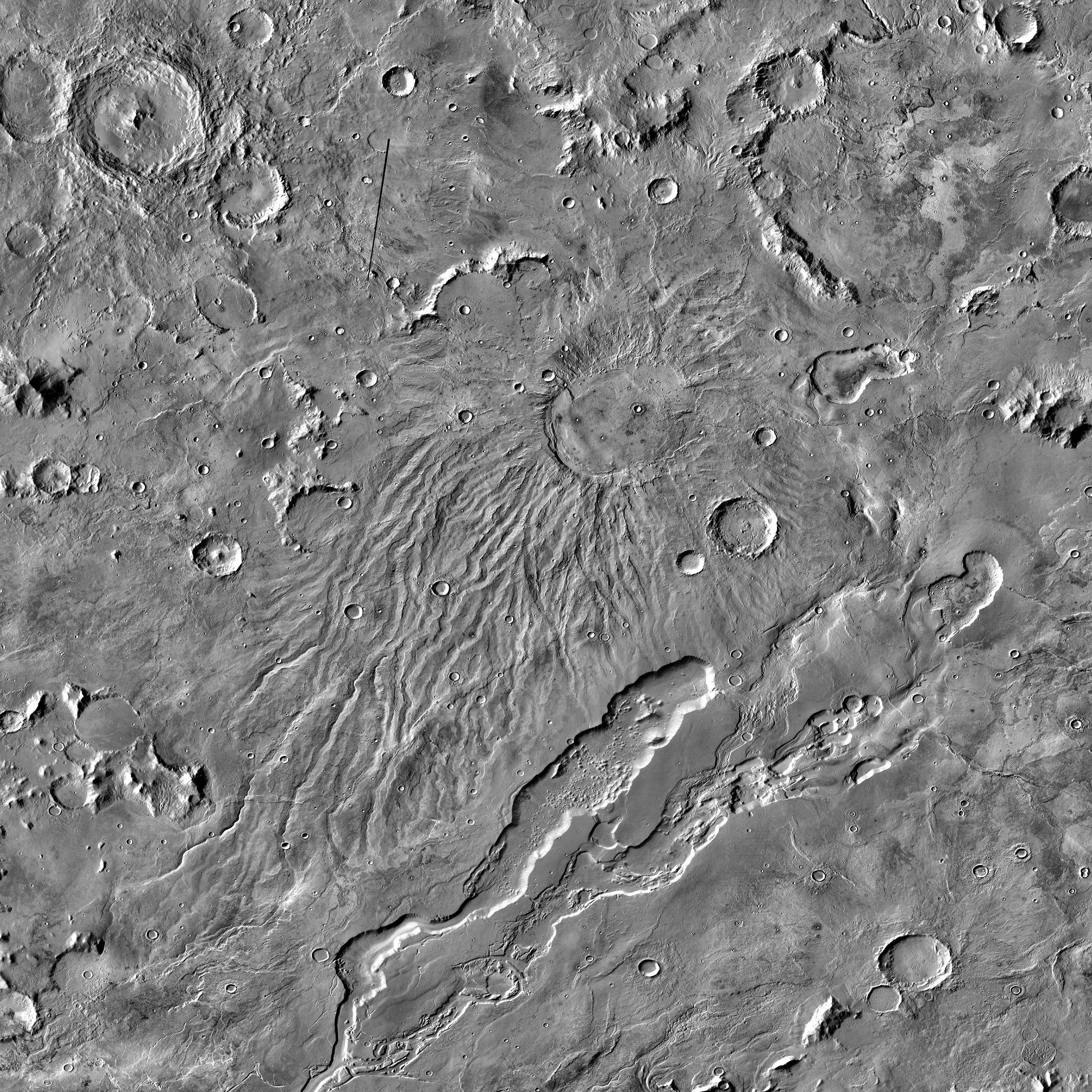
- THEMIS daytime IR mosaic of Hadriacus Mons. The caldera, with gullies radiating from it, is just to the upper right of center; the outflow channels Dao Vallis and Niger Vallis merge near the bottom.
- Coordinates: 31.29°S 91.86°E

Hadriacus Mons is an ancient, low-relief volcanic mountain on the planet Mars, located in the southern hemisphere just northeast of the impact basin Hellas and southwest of the similar volcano Tyrrhenus Mons. Hadriacus Mons is in the Hellas quadrangle. It has a diameter of 450 kilometres (280 mi). The name was approved in 2007. The flanks of Hadriacus Mons have been eroded into gullies; its southern slopes are incised by the outflow channel Dao Vallis. The large extent of volcanic deposits and the caldera size leads some researchers to suggest that these features were the result of an explosive event caused by a contact between magma and groundwater.

Hadriaca Patera, a term formerly used for the entire edifice, is now only used for the central caldera, which is 66 kilometres (41 mi) in diameter.

It has been suggested that lava tubes at Hadriacus Mons could provide a location for a human habitat that would screen out harmful radiation.

== See also ==
- List of mountains on Mars
- List of mountains on Mars by height
- Volcanoes on Mars
