= Harmakhis Vallis =

Vallis on Mars

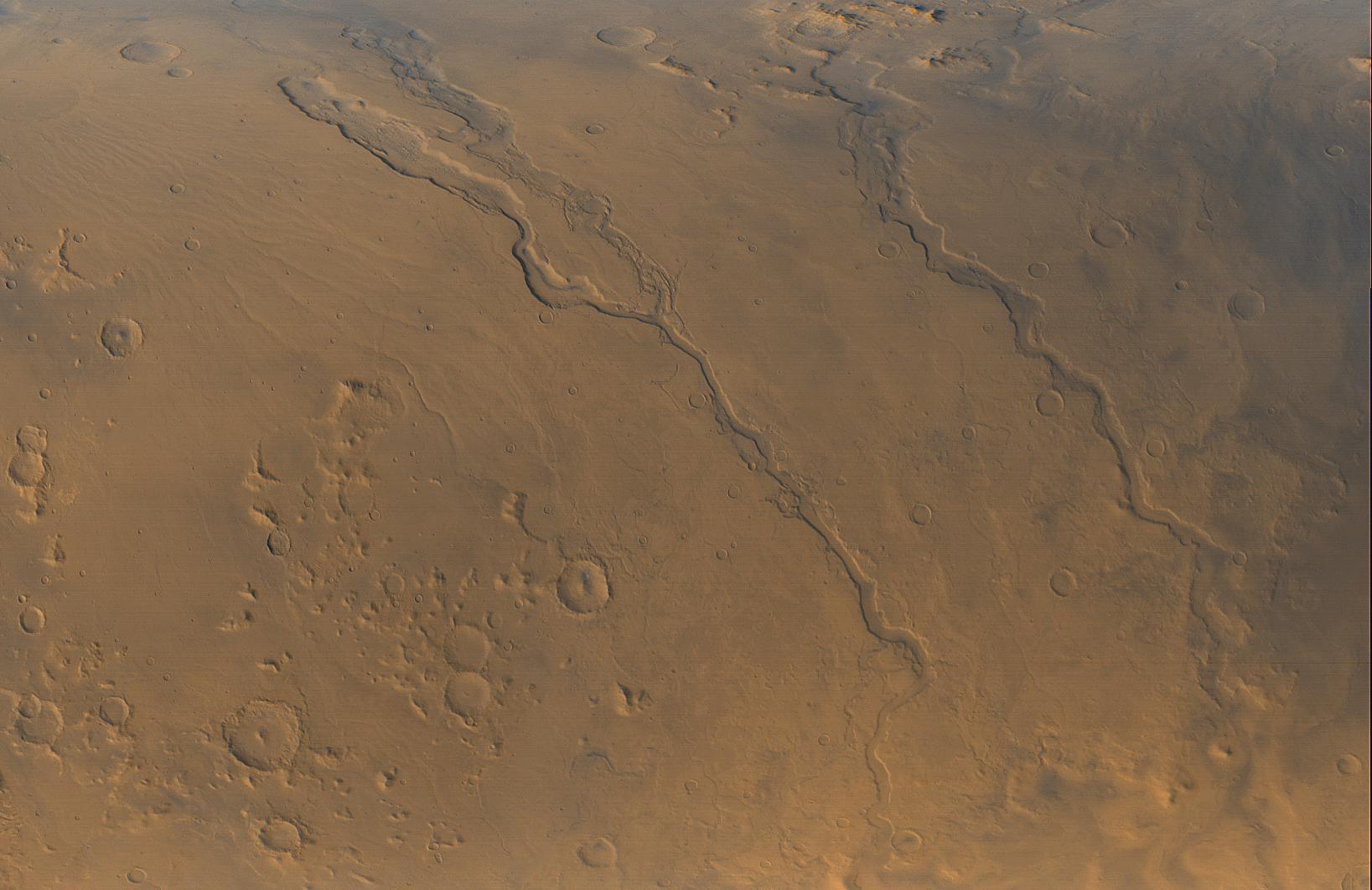
- Harmakhis Vallis is the rightmost channel pictured. The direction of water flow was toward the bottom of the image.
- Coordinates: 40.4°S 90.4°E
- Naming: Ancient Egyptian word for "Mars"

Harmakhis Vallis is a valley near Hellas Planitia, Mars. It has been identified as an outflow channel, the site of catastrophic floods of water during Mars' past.

Gullies are also common on the wall of Harmakhis Vallis, as seen the image below. Some authors have suggested these structures indicate geologically recent flow of small quantities of water across the surface.

Gullies in the wall of Harmakhis, as seen by HiRISE.

== See also ==
- Dao Vallis
- Reull Vallis
