= Nigar Hasan-Zadeh =

Nigar Hasan-Zadeh, (Azerbaijani: Nigar Həsən-zadə, Russian: Нигяр Гасан-заде) is a poet, philologist of Russian language and literature. She is a member of the Union of Azerbaijani Writers, and a member of Pen International Director of "Söz" literary project run by the Ministry of Culture and Tourism of Azerbaijan. Her poems have been translated into many languages and have appeared in translation all over the world including the UK, Italy, Germany, Canada, Australia, Hungary, Poland, Turkey, Iran, Israel, and Russia, etc. Her eastern style of writing had won her the reputation of poet with unique language combining different traditions of writing. From 2000 to 2014, Nigar had lived and worked in London/UK.

== Life ==
Nigar Hasan-Zadeh was born in Baku the capital of Azerbaijan.

Nigar had been performing her poetry on the most prestigious stages in the capital of Great Britain such as South Bank, ICA, River Side Studios, Poetry Café, Lauderdale House and Pushkin House and many others. She has taken part international Poetry readings, Conferences, literature festivals.

In 2009, Nigar was chosen among the 10 best foreign poets living and working in the UK to be recorded for sound archives by British Library. Nigar had numerous interviews on BBC4, Russian BBC radio, Azerbaijani voice of BBC radio. In 2015 Nigar was appointed as a director of the literary project "Söz" in Baku, run by the Ministry of Culture and Tourism of Azerbaijan. From 2015, "Söz" introduced more than 100 people to audiences at the best stages in the capital. "Söz" organised literary evenings of foreign literature cooperating with many embassies in the country. The project gave chances to unknown writers and poets to reach their readers and to find their own professional places in the literature circle. In 2016 – literary projects of the international organization The European Azerbaijan Society (TEAS), Azerbaijan – European Organization in London.

== Publications ==
- 2000—published her first collection of poetry in Russian "On Wings over the Horizon".
- 2001—became the youngest member of the Azerbaijani Union of Writers.
- 2001—awarded the Azerbaijan Academy's Humay Award for the volume "On Wings Over the Horizon" nominated as "Best poetry book of the year".
- 2002—the book "On Wings Over the Horizon" was published in London in translation by Richard McKane.
- 2004—The second collection of poetry "Under Alien Clouds…" was published in Russian.
- 2005—was included in anthology of Best Contemporary Russian Women Poets.
- 2007—published a collection of poetry Serebro (Silver) in Russian
- 2012—published mystical fairy tale "The Little Fairy Teller and White Bird Nara" in Russian (Moscow/Russia)
