= Hellas quadrangle =

Map of Mars

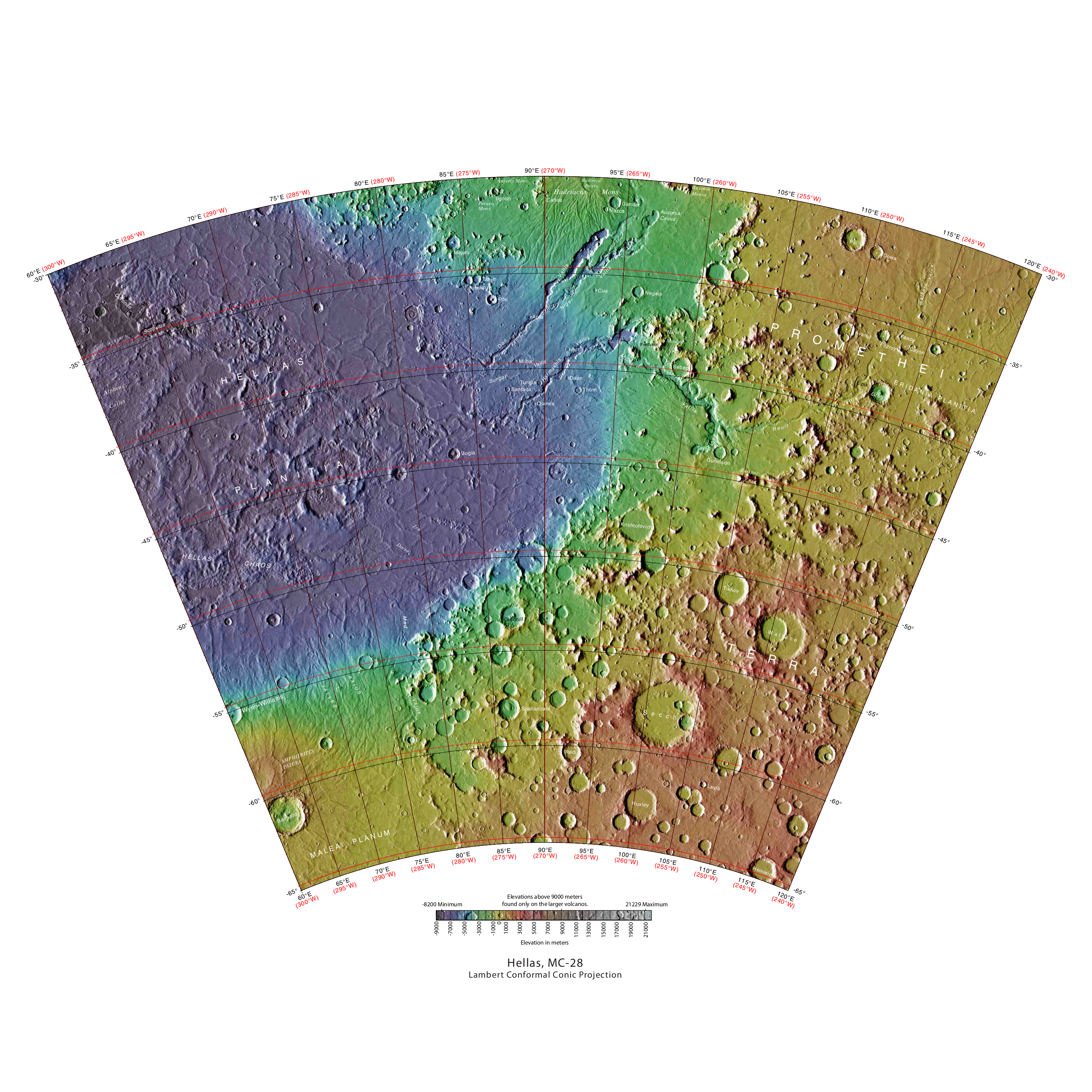
- Elevation map of Hellas quadrangle from Mars Orbiter Laser Altimeter (MOLA) data.
- Coordinates: 47.5°S 270°W

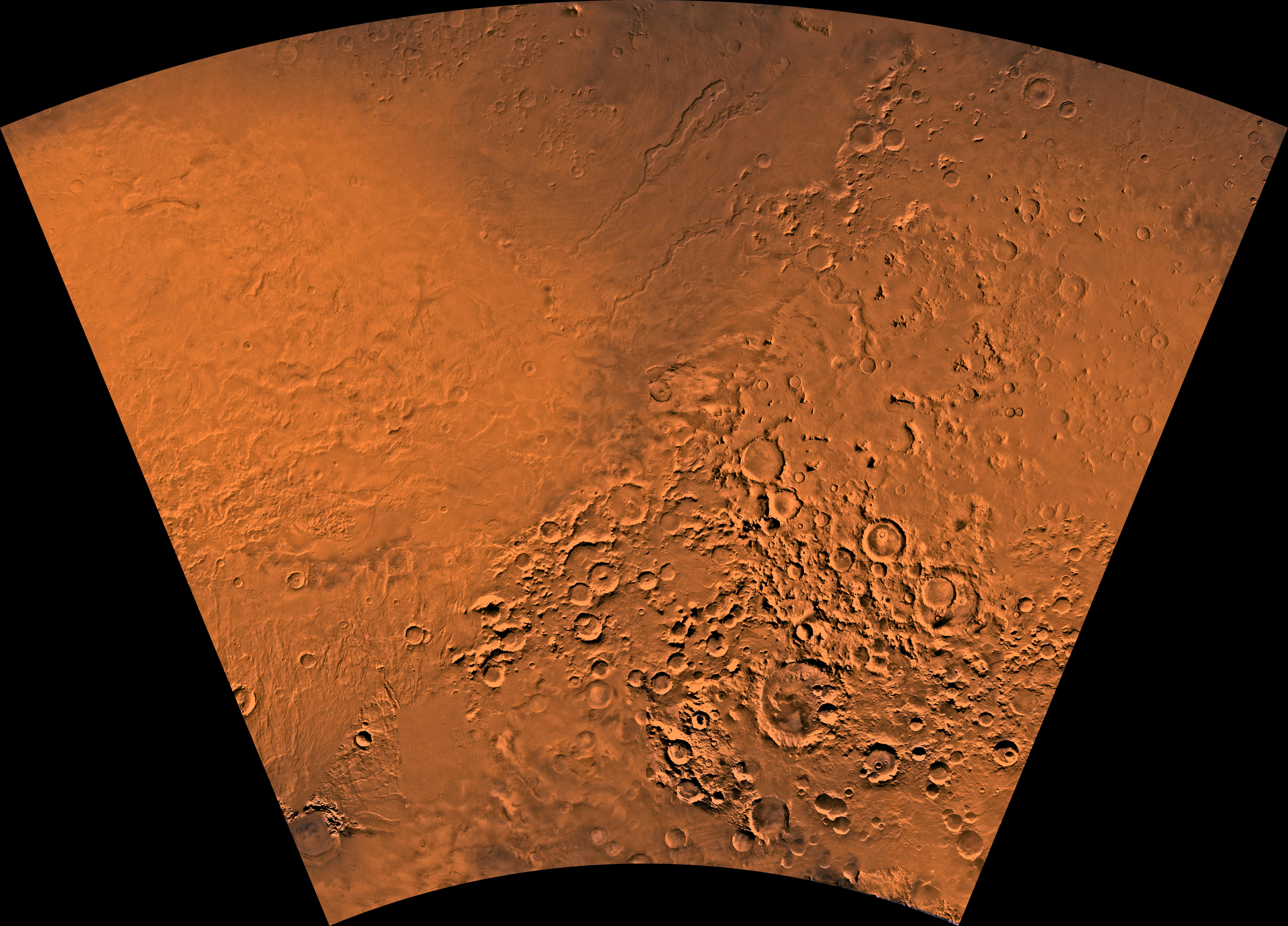
Image of the Hellas Quadrangle (MC-28). The northwestern part contains the eastern half of Hellas basin. The southwest part includes Amphitrites volcano. The northern part contains Hadriaca Patera. The eastern part is mainly heavily cratered highlands.

The Hellas quadrangle is one of a series of 30 quadrangle maps of Mars used by the United States Geological Survey (USGS) Astrogeology Research Program. The Hellas quadrangle is also referred to as MC-28 (Mars Chart-28). The Hellas quadrangle covers the area from 240° to 300° west longitude and 30° to 65° south latitude on the planet Mars. Within the Hellas quadrangle lies the classic features Hellas Planitia and Promethei Terra. Many interesting and mysterious features have been discovered in the Hellas quadrangle, including the giant river valleys Dao Vallis, Niger Vallis, Harmakhis, and Reull Vallis—all of which may have contributed water to a lake in the Hellas basin in the distant past. Many places in the Hellas quadrangle show signs of ice in the ground, especially places with glacier-like flow features.

== Hellas Basin ==
The Hellas quadrangle contains part of the Hellas Basin, the largest known impact crater on the surface of Mars and the second largest in the Solar System. The depth of the crater is 7152 m (23,000 ft) below the standard topographic datum of Mars. The basin is located in the southern highlands of Mars and is thought to have been formed about 3.9 billion years ago, during the Late Heavy Bombardment. In the Northwest portion of Hellas Planitia is a strange type of surface called complex banded terrain or taffy-pull terrain. Its process of formation is still largely unknown, although it appears to be due to erosion of hard and soft sediment along with ductile deformation. Ductile deformation results from layers undergoing strain.

Early in the planet's history, it is believed that a giant lake existed in the Hellas Basin. Possible shorelines have been discovered. These are evident in alternating benches and scarps visible in Mars orbiting camera narrow-angle images. In addition, Mars orbiting laser altimeter (MOLA) data show that the contacts of these sedimentary units mark contours of constant elevation for thousands of km, and in one case all around the basin. Channels, believed to be formed by water, enter into the basin. The Hellas drainage basin may be almost one-fifth that of the entire northern plains. A lake in Hellas in today's Martian climate would form a thick ice at the top that would eventually sublimate away. That is the ice would turn directly from a solid to a gas. This is similar to how dry ice (solid carbon dioxide) behaves on Earth. Glacial features (terminal moraines, drumlins, and eskers) have been found that may have been formed when the water froze.

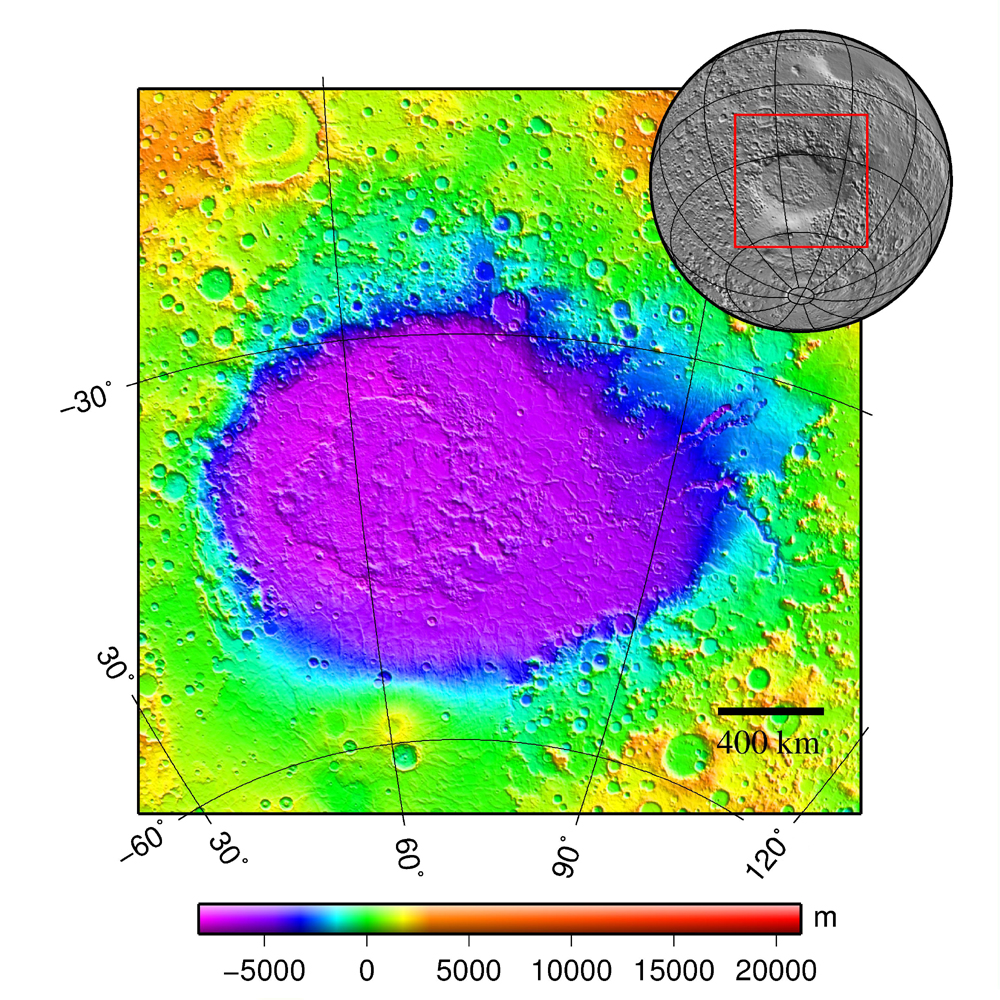
Topography of Hellas Basin

== Lobate debris aprons ==
One important feature common in east Hellas are piles of material surrounding cliffs. The formation is called a lobate debris apron (LDA). Recently, research with the Shallow Radar on the Mars Reconnaissance Orbiter has provided strong evidence that the LDAs are glaciers that are covered with a thin layer of rocks. Large amounts of water ice are believed to be in the LDAs. Available evidence strongly suggests that the eastern part of Hellas accumulated snow in the past. When the tilt (obliquity) of Mars increases the southern ice cap releases large amounts of water vapor. Climate models predict that when this occurs, water vapor condenses and falls where LDAs are located. The tilt of the Earth changes little because its relatively large moon keeps it stable. The two tiny Martian moons do not stabilize their planet, so the rotational axis of Mars undergoes large variations. Lobate debris aprons may be a major source of water for future Mars colonists. Their major advantage over other sources of Martian water are that they can easily mapped from orbit and they are closer to the equator, where crewed missions are more likely to land.

== See also ==
- Climate of Mars
- Geology of Mars
- HiRISE
- HiWish program
- List of quadrangles on Mars
- Martian gullies
- Ore resources on Mars
- Water on Mars

MC-01 Mare Boreum (features)
MC-02 Diacria (features)		MC-03 Arcadia (features)	MC-04 Acidalium (features)	MC-05 Ismenius Lacus (features)		MC-06 Casius (features)	MC-07 Cebrenia (features)
MC-08 Amazonis (features)	MC-09 Tharsis (features)	MC-10 Lunae Palus (features)	MC-11 Oxia Palus (features)	MC-12 Arabia (features)	MC-13 Syrtis Major (features)	MC-14 Amenthes (features)	MC-15 Elysium (features)
MC-16 Memnonia (features)	MC-17 Phoenicis Lacus (features)	MC-18 Coprates (features)	MC-19 Margaritifer Sinus (features)	MC-20 Sinus Sabaeus (features)	MC-21 Iapygia (features)	MC-22 Mare Tyrrhenum (features)	MC-23 Aeolis (features)
MC-24 Phaethontis (features)		MC-25 Thaumasia (features)	MC-26 Argyre (features)	MC-27 Noachis (features)		MC-28 Hellas (features)	MC-29 Eridania (features)
MC-30 Mare Australe (features)
