= Negar-e Pain =

Negar-e Pain نگرپايين
- Village
- Location within Iran
- Coordinates: 25°50′20″N 57°36′54″E
- Country: Iran
- Province: Hormozgan
- County: Jask
- Bakhsh: Central
- Rural District: Jask

Population (2006)
  - Total: 381
- Time zone: UTC+3:30 (IRST)
  - Summer (DST): UTC+4:30 (IRDT)

Negar-e Pain (Persian: نگرپايين, also Romanized as Negar-e Pā’īn; also known as Nūvār-e Pā’īn) is a village in Jask Rural District, in the Central District of Jask County, Hormozgan Province, Iran. At the 2006 census, its population was 381, in 77 families.
