= Chrysops niger =

Scientific classification
- Kingdom: Animalia
- Phylum: Arthropoda
- Clade: Pancrustacea
- Class: Insecta
- Order: Diptera
- Family: Tabanidae
- Tribe: Chrysopsini
- Genus: Chrysops
- Species: C. niger

Binomial name
- Chrysops niger Macquart, 1838

Synonyms
- Chrysops niger var taylori Philip, 1955

Species of fly

Chrysops niger, the black deer fly, is a fly of about 8–10.5 millimetres (0.31–0.41 in) length, with a mostly black body with some white hairs, and having wings which are barred with black. They are active from May to September around areas of marsh.

The larvae of the black deer fly feed upon organic matter in damp soil, and are termed hydrobionts in that they inhabit areas of high water content.

== Distribution ==
Eastern United States and Canada.
