= Nigar Sultana =

Nigar Sultana may refer to:

- Nigar Sultana (actress) (1932–2000), Indian actress
- Nigar Sultana (cricketer), Bangladeshi cricketer
