= Niger Vallis =

Martian valley

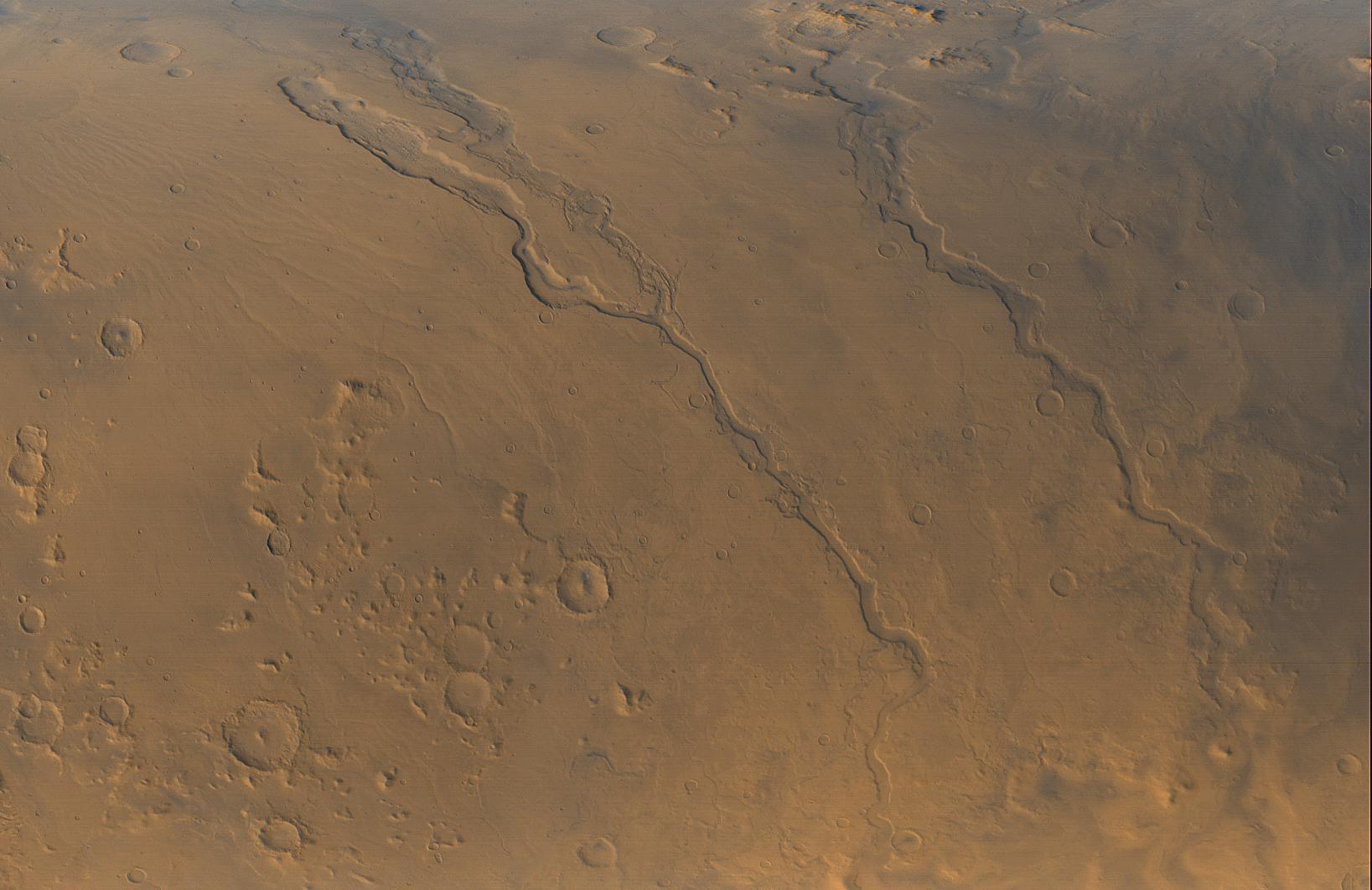
- Niger Vallis is the middle of the three channels pictured, joining Dao Vallis in the upper center of the image. The direction of water flow was toward the bottom of the image.
- Coordinates: 35.4°S 267.8°W
- Length: 333.0 km
- Naming: River in Africa.

Niger Vallis is a valley on Mars that appears to have been carved by water. It has been identified as an outflow channel. It merges with Dao Vallis which runs southwestward into Hellas Planitia from the volcanic Hadriacus Mons. Like Dao, it was formed around the Late Noachian and Early Hesperian Epochs. It is named after the Niger River in Africa.

== Ice-rich mantle ==
Much of the surface of Mars is covered by a thick smooth mantle that is thought to be a mixture of ice and dust. This ice-rich mantle, a few yards thick, smooths the land, but in places it has a bumpy texture, resembling the surface of a basketball. Because there are few craters on this mantle, the mantle is relatively young. An image below shows a good view of this smooth mantle around Niger Vallis, as observed with HiRISE.

Changes in Mars's orbit and tilt cause significant changes in the distribution of water ice from polar regions down to latitudes equivalent to Texas. During certain climate periods water vapor leaves polar ice and enters the atmosphere. The water comes back to ground at lower latitudes as deposits of frost or snow mixed generously with dust. The atmosphere of Mars contains a great deal of fine dust particles. Water vapor will condense on the particles, then fall down to the ground due to the additional weight of the water coating. When ice at the top of the mantling layer goes back into the atmosphere, it leaves behind dust, which insulates the remaining ice.

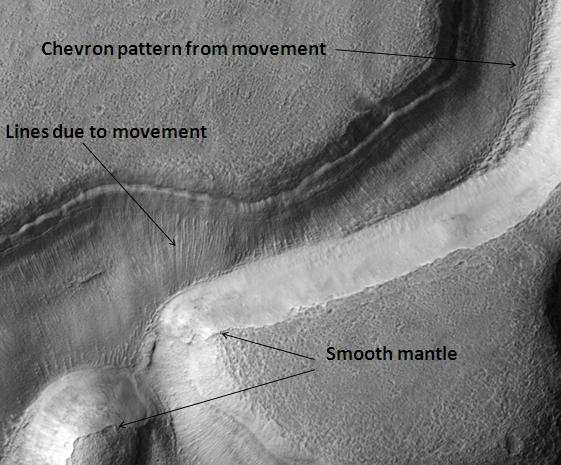
Niger Vallis with features typical of this latitude, as seen by HiRISE. Click on image to see chevron pattern and mantle.
