= Negar-e Bala =

Negar-e Bala نگربالا
- Village
- Location within Iran
- Coordinates: 25°50′52″N 57°37′45″E
- Country: Iran
- Province: Hormozgan
- County: Jask
- Bakhsh: Central
- Rural District: Jask

Population (2006)
  - Total: 249
- Time zone: UTC+3:30 (IRST)
  - Summer (DST): UTC+4:30 (IRDT)

Negar-e Bala (Persian: نگربالا, also Romanized as Negar-e Bālā; also known as Negar, Negar-e ‘Olyā, Nīgar, Nigor, Nigwar, and Nūvār-e Bālā) is a village in Jask Rural District, in the Central District of Jask County, Hormozgan Province, Iran. At the 2006 census, its population was 249, in 43 families.
