= Niger (disambiguation) =

Niger is a landlocked country in Western Africa.

Niger may also refer to:

== Places ==
- Niger River, a river in West Africa
- Niger Delta, the delta of the Niger River
- Niger State, the largest state in Nigeria
- Niger River (Tomifobia River tributary), a river in Estrie, Quebec, Canada
- Niger Vallis, a valley on Mars that appears to have been carved by water
- 8766 Niger, an asteroid

== People ==
=== Given name ===
- Niger Innis (born 1968), American political consultant and strategist

=== Surname ===
- Simeon Niger, person in the Book of Acts in the New Testament
- Pescennius Niger (c. 135/140 – 194), Roman usurper
- Sextius Niger, Roman writer on pharmacology during the reign of Augustus
- Ermoldus Nigellus or Niger (fl. 824 – c. 830), poet at the court of Pippin of Aquitaine
- Dub, King of Scotland (c. 928 – 967), called Niger
- Ralph Niger (c. 1140 – c. 1217), Anglo-French theologian and Archdeacon of Gloucester
- Roger Niger (died 1241), Bishop of London
- Peter Georg Niger (1434–1481/1484), Dominican theologian, preacher and controversialist
- Shmuel Niger (1883–1955), Yiddish writer
- Toma Niger (c. 1450 – c. 1532), Croatian diplomat
- Paul Niger (1915–1962), political activist from Basse-Terre, Guadeloupe

== Other uses ==
- HMS Niger, several British warships
- Niger-class frigate, a class of Royal Navy frigate built in the mid 18th century
- Guizotia abyssinica, a cultivated plant with the common name 'niger'
- Niger '66: A Peace Corps Diary, a 2010 Nigerien documentary film
- Niger (trotter horse), a trotter horse born in 1869

== See also ==
- Black § Etymology
- Nigga
- Nigger
- Nigeria (disambiguation)
- Nigar (disambiguation)
- Nigra (disambiguation)
- Nigger (disambiguation)
