= Nigra =

Nigra may refer to:

== Geography ==
- Castelnuovo Nigra, a comune (municipality) in the province of Turin in the Italian region Piedmont
- Nigra (Brahmani), a major tributary of the Brahmani River, India
- Porta Nigra, a large Roman city gate in Trier, Germany
- Rupes Nigra, a phantom island, was believed to be a 33-mile-wide magnetic island of black rock located at the Magnetic North Pole

== Medicine ==
- Dermatosis papulosa nigra, a condition of many small, benign skin lesions on that face that closely simulate seborrheic keratoses, a condition generally presenting on dark-skinned individuals
- Linea nigra, a dark vertical line that appears on the abdomen during pregnancy
- Substantia nigra, a portion of the brain associated with dopamine production
- Tinea nigra, a superficial fungal infection that causes dark brown to black painless patches on the soles of the hands and feet

== People ==
- Christina Nigra, an actress who performed in The Sword and the Sorcerer, Twilight Zone: The Movie, and Cloak & Dagger
- Costantino Nigra, an Italian diplomatist

== Other uses ==
- Patriotic Nigras, a group of griefers in the virtual world Second Life
- By extension, a suit-wearing Afro-styled avatar used by the group for raids in Habbo Hotel
- A variant spelling of "Negro"

== See also ==
- Niger (disambiguation)
