= List of Stenotabanus species =

These species belong to Stenotabanus, a genus of horse flies in the family Tabanidae.

== Stenotabanus species ==
- Stenotabanus abacus Philip, 1954
- Stenotabanus aberrans Philip, 1966
- Stenotabanus alayoi Cruz & García, 1974
- Stenotabanus albidocinctus (Bigot, 1892)
- Stenotabanus albilinearis Philip, 1960
- Stenotabanus albiscutellatus Chainey, 1999
- Stenotabanus alticolus Fairchild, 1980
- Stenotabanus atlanticus (Johnson, 1914)
- Stenotabanus barahona Fairchild, 1980
- Stenotabanus batesi (Bequaert, 1940)
- Stenotabanus bequaerti Rafael, Fairchild & Goarayeb, 1982
- Stenotabanus blantoni Fairchild, 1953
- Stenotabanus braziliensis Chainey & Gorayeb, 1999
- Stenotabanus brevistylatus Kröber, 1929
- Stenotabanus brodzinskyi Lane, Poinar & Fairchild, 1988
- Stenotabanus bruesi (Hine, 1920)
- Stenotabanus brunetii (Bequaert, 1940)
- Stenotabanus brunneus Wilkerson, 1979
- Stenotabanus brunnipennis Kröber, 1930
- Stenotabanus brunnipes Kröber, 1929
- Stenotabanus calvitius Fairchild, 1942
- Stenotabanus cerrascoi Henriques & Krolow, 2020
- Stenotabanus chaineyi Henriques & Krolow, 2020
- Stenotabanus changuinolae Fairchild, 1942
- Stenotabanus chiapanensis Fairchild, 1953
- Stenotabanus chrysonotus Wilkerson, 1979
- Stenotabanus cinereus (Wiedemann, 1821)
- Stenotabanus cipoensis Chainey, 1999
- Stenotabanus clavijoi Gorayeb, Tiape Gomez & Valásquez de Rios, 2013
- Stenotabanus confusus Cruz & García, 1974
- Stenotabanus cretatus Fairchild, 1961
- Stenotabanus cribellum (Osten Sacken, 1886)
- Stenotabanus detersus (Walker, 1850)
- Stenotabanus dusbabeki Cruz & García, 1974
- Stenotabanus fairchildi Chvála, 1967
- Stenotabanus farri Philip, 1958
- Stenotabanus fenestra (Williston, 1887)
- Stenotabanus flavidus (Hine, 1904)
- Stenotabanus floridensis (Hine, 1912)
- Stenotabanus fuliginosus (Lutz & Neiva, 1914)
- Stenotabanus fulvistriatus (Hine, 1912)
- Stenotabanus fumipenns Kröber, 1929
- Stenotabanus geijskesi Fairchild, 1953
- Stenotabanus guttatulus (Townsend, 1893)
- Stenotabanus henriquesi Chainey, 1999
- Stenotabanus hispaniolae (Bequaert, 1940)
- Stenotabanus hyalinalis Chainey, Hall & Gorayeb, 1999
- Stenotabanus incipiens (Walker, 1860)
- Stenotabanus indotatus Ibáñez-Bernal, 1991
- Stenotabanus irregularis Chainey & Hall, 1999
- Stenotabanus ixyostactes (Wiedemann, 1828)
- Stenotabanus jamaicensis (Newstead, 1909)
- Stenotabanus liokylon Fairchild, 1961
- Stenotabanus litotes Fairchild, 1953
- Stenotabanus littoreus (Hine, 1907)
- Stenotabanus longipennis Kröber, 1929
- Stenotabanus luteolineatus Wilkerson, 1979
- Stenotabanus macroceras Philip, 1960
- Stenotabanus marcanoi Fairchild, 1980
- Stenotabanus mellifluus (Bequaert, 1940)
- Stenotabanus mexicanus Philip, 1977
- Stenotabanus minusculus (Kröber, 1930)
- Stenotabanus neivai Borgmeier, 1933
- Stenotabanus nervosus (Curran, 1931)
- Stenotabanus nigriculus Wilkerson, 1979
- Stenotabanus nigriscapus Chainey & Hall, 1999
- Stenotabanus obscuremarginatus Kröber, 1929
- Stenotabanus obscurus Kröber, 1929
- Stenotabanus oleariorum Strelow, Solórzano-Kraemer, Ibáñez-Bernal & Rust, 2013
- Stenotabanus paitillensis Fairchild, 1942
- Stenotabanus pallidicornis Kröber, 1929
- Stenotabanus pallipes Kröber, 1929
- Stenotabanus paradoxus (Lutz, 1913)
- Stenotabanus parallelus (Walker, 1848)
- Stenotabanus parsonsi (Bequaert, 1940)
- Stenotabanus parvulus (Williston, 1887)
- Stenotabanus pechumani Philip, 1966
- Stenotabanus penai Chainey, 1999
- Stenotabanus peruviensis Kröber, 1929
- Stenotabanus picticornis (Bigot, 1892)
- Stenotabanus platyfrons Fairchild, 1964
- Stenotabanus pompholyx Fairchild, 1953
- Stenotabanus psammophilus (Osten Sacken, 1876)
- Stenotabanus pseudotaeniotes Kröber, 1929
- Stenotabanus pumiloides (Williston, 1901)
- Stenotabanus pusillus Cruz & García, 1974
- Stenotabanus quinquestriatus Kröber, 1929
- Stenotabanus roxannae Wilkerson, 1979
- Stenotabanus sandyi Gorayeb, 1988
- Stenotabanus sordidatus Fairchild, 1958
- Stenotabanus sphaeriscapus Wilkerson, 1985
- Stenotabanus sputnikulus Philip, 1958
- Stenotabanus staryi Fairchild, 1968
- Stenotabanus stigma (Fabricius, 1805)
- Stenotabanus stonei Philip, 1958
- Stenotabanus subtilis (Bellardi, 1862)
- Stenotabanus taeniotes (Wiedemann, 1828)
- Stenotabanus tenuistria Fairchild, 1961
- Stenotabanus tobagensis Fairchild, 1958
- Stenotabanus trilunatus Philip, 1968
- Stenotabanus trinotatus (Wiedemann, 1828)
- Stenotabanus vitripennis (Lutz, 1913)
- Stenotabanus wilkersoni Chainey, 1999
- Stenotabanus wolcotti Fairchild, 1980
- Stenotabanus woodruffi Fairchild & Lane, 1989
