= São Paulo Zoo =

Zoo in São Paulo, Brazil

Parque Zoológico de São Paulo
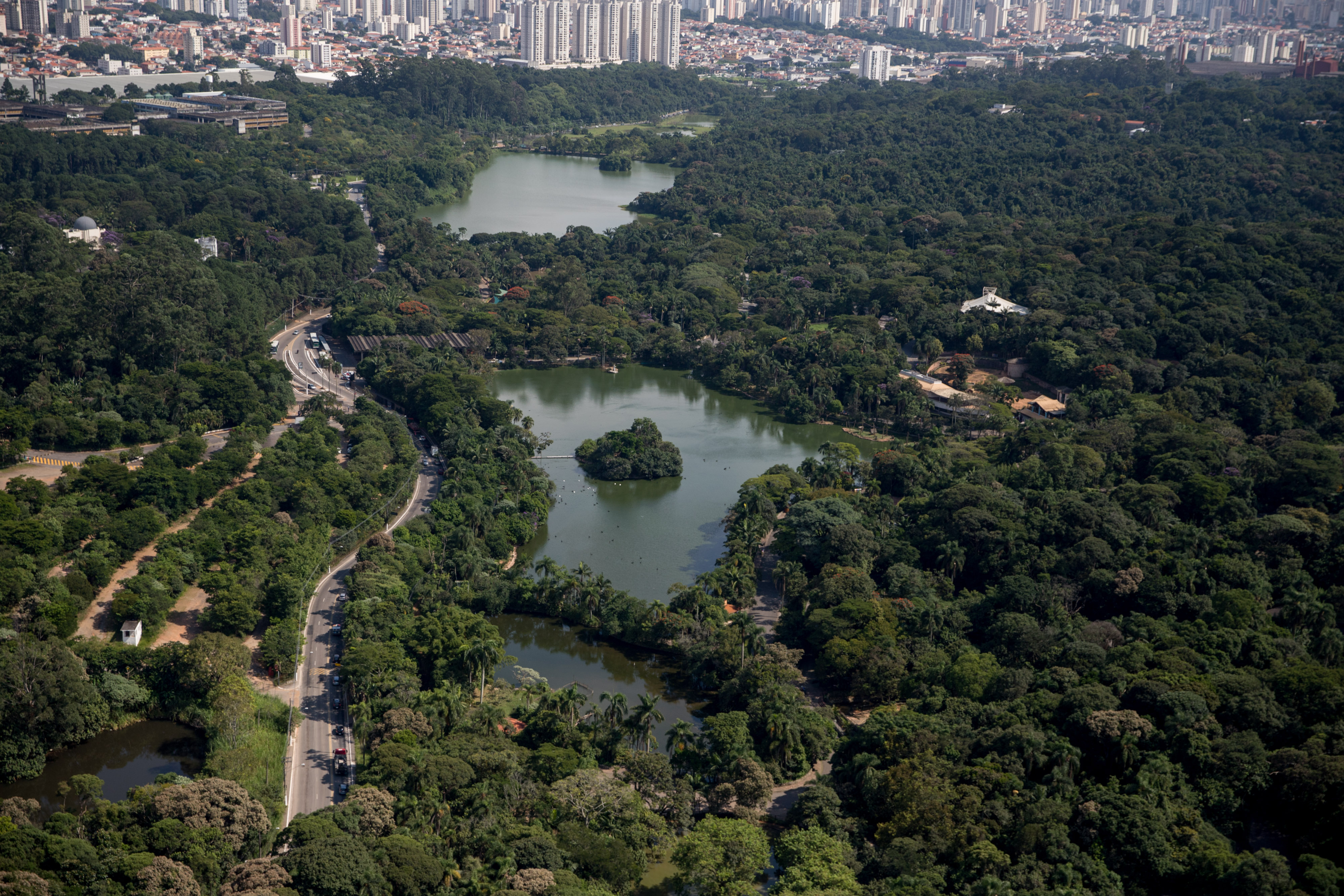
- Aerial view of the São Paulo Zoo
- Interactive map of Parque Zoológico de São Paulo
- 23.649301°S 46.622157°W
- Date opened: 16 March 1958
- Location: Avenida Miguel Stefano, 4241; Cursino, São Paulo, Brazil
- Land area: 824,529 m^{2} (8,875,160 sq ft)
- No. of animals: 3200+
- No. of species: 444
- Owner: Consórcio Reserva Paulista
- Website: www.zoologico.com.br

The São Paulo Zoo (Portuguese: Parque Zoológico de São Paulo), located in the South Zone of the city, is the largest zoo in Brazil. With 824,529 m^{2} (8,875,160 sq ft) of space in what was originally the Atlantic Forest, it is home to the spring of the historic Ipiranga Brook and has four kilometers of pathways. The São Paulo Zoo was inaugurated in 1958 featuring a little more than four hundred animals.

The facility hosts over 3,200 animals, 102 species of mammals, 216 species of birds, 95 species of reptiles, 15 species of amphibians and 16 species of invertebrates in enclosures that replicate the natural habitats of these animals. The zoo's farm of 572 ha produces vegetables used in the manufacturing of feed for various animals, and material for the enclosures where the animals are. It also has animals that need extra space for mating.

The zoo has a nursery for cubs who are rejected by their mothers, electric incubators and an incubation room for eggs of birds and reptiles. The educational function is emphasized in the zoo. Its library of more than four thousand volumes is open to the public. Its partnerships with other state, federal and foreign institutions includes research that facilitates the preservation of endangered species.

== History ==
The São Paulo Zoo was created in June 1957, from a statement of the then governor Jânio Quadros to the head of the São Paulo State Secretary of Agriculture's Department of Fish and Game, Emilio Varoli. The first animals of exotic origin such as lions, camels, bears and elephants, were acquired from private circuses while Brazilian wild fauna animals, such as jaguars and cock-of-the-rock, were acquired in Manaus.

The opening of the zoo, originally scheduled for January 1958, was postponed due to heavy rains that year, and on 16 March São Paulo Zoo was officially inaugurated featuring 445 animals, including nine deer, two spotted jaguars and one black jaguar, three ocelots, two wild cats, one bear, 23 parrots, three Spix's macaws, and the rhinoceros Cacareco, made famous by the episode when it was elected city councilor in the elections of October 1958.

Aware of its responsibility in the national context, the São Paulo Zoo became the first Brazilian institution to propose and effectively participate in multiple programs for the recovery of Brazilian species seriously threatened with disappearing from nature, such as the lion tamarin, small neotropical felids and Lear's macaws.

In its first year of operation, zoo admission was free, and from the creation of the Zoological Park of São Paulo, in the following year, they began to charge for tickets. The São Paulo Zoo Foundation obtained, in 1959, legal personality and administrative, financial and scientific autonomy and is responsible for the administration of the park through the following bodies: Superior Council; Advisory Council; Fiscal Council and Board of Directors.

That same year, goals were set for the São Paulo Zoo Foundation: to maintain a population of live animals from all fauna for public education and recreation, as well as for biological research; to establish a Biological Station within its area of coverage for research on the region's fauna and related studies; and to provide facilities for the work of Brazilian and foreign researchers in the field of zoology, in its broadest sense, through agreements, contracts or scholarships.

=== Current status ===
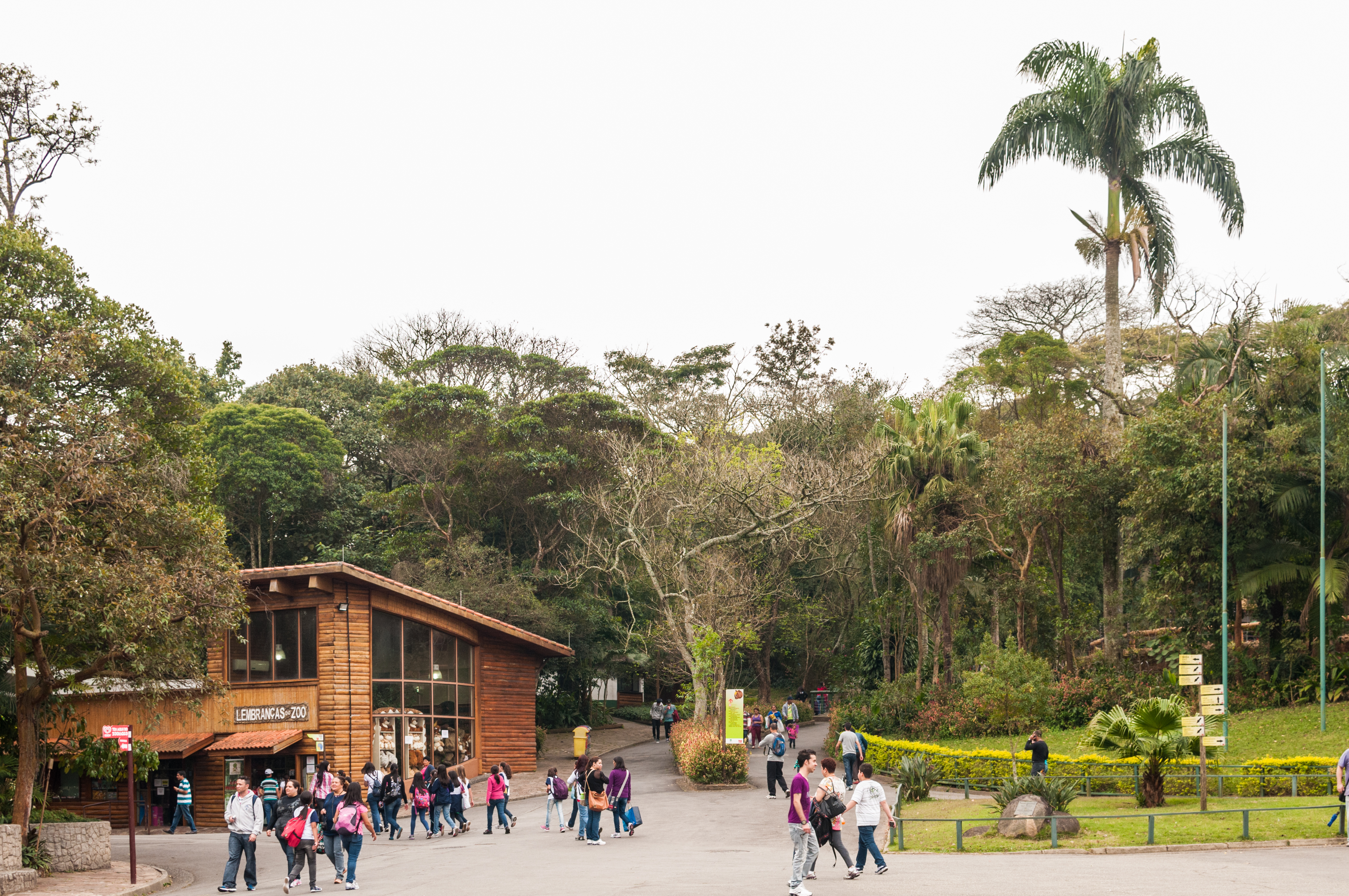
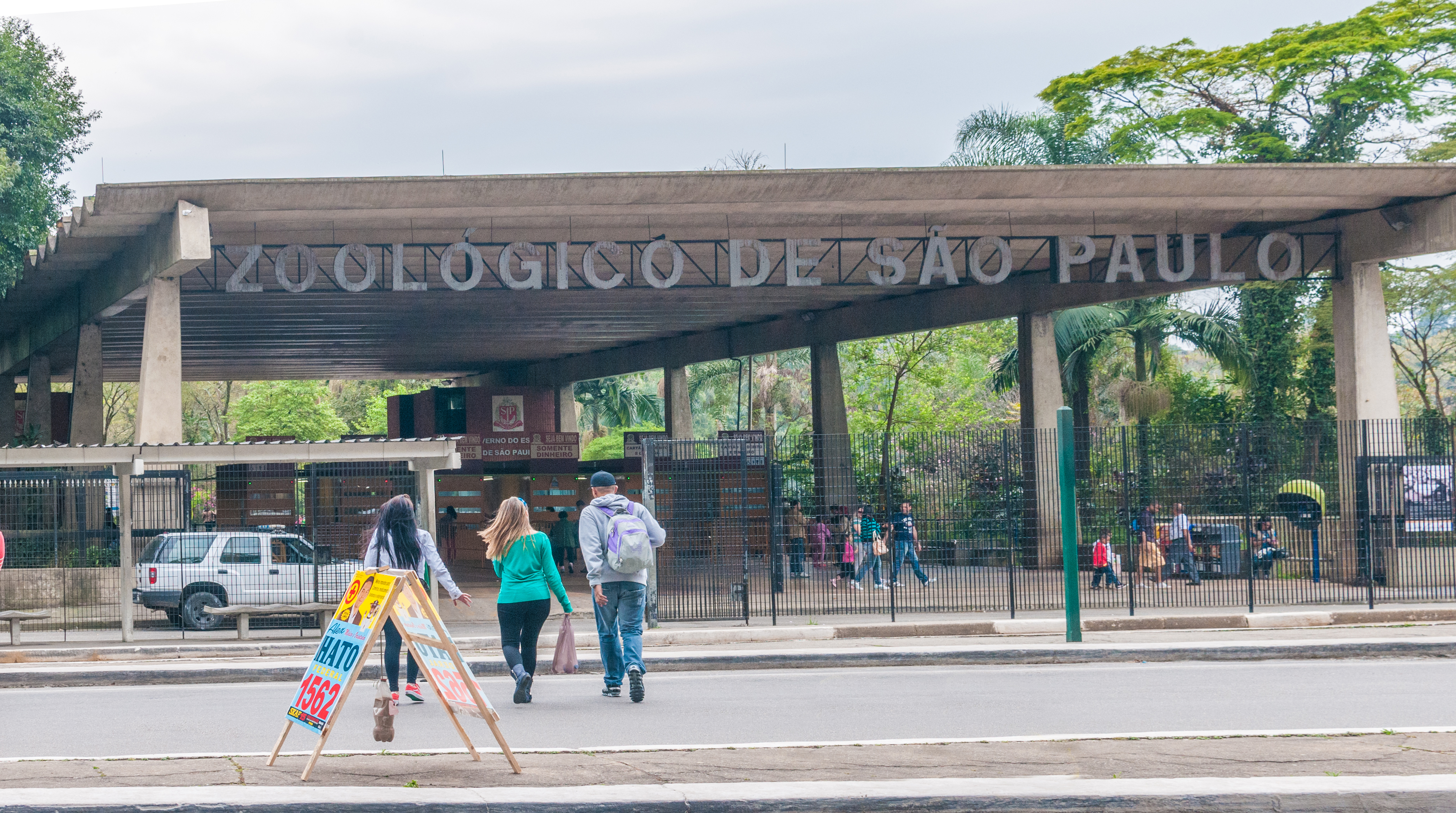
Zoo entrance

The São Paulo Zoo became the first Brazilian institution to propose and engage in various recovery programs of seriously endangered Brazilian species such as the lion tamarin, small neotropical felids, hyacinth macaw and Lear's macaws, European bison, bush dog, condor, the only snow leopard in Brazil, spectacled bear, the Malayan gharial, orangutans and white rhinoceroses. Since 1994, the São Paulo Zoo is recognized by the Guinness Book as the largest zoo in Brazil. That same year, the Zoological Park of São Paulo was classified in the highest category for environmental management entities and preservation of species by the Brazilian Institute of Environment and Renewable Natural Resources (IBAMA). In May 2001, the area next to the zoo which was occupied by the company "Simba Safari" was reincorporated into the Zoological Park of São Paulo. It was reopened to the public as "Zoo Safari" on June 5 of that year, providing tours where one can see the animals in the woods or drive through areas where animals roam.

In addition to seeing the animals, there are lectures and workshops available to participate in.

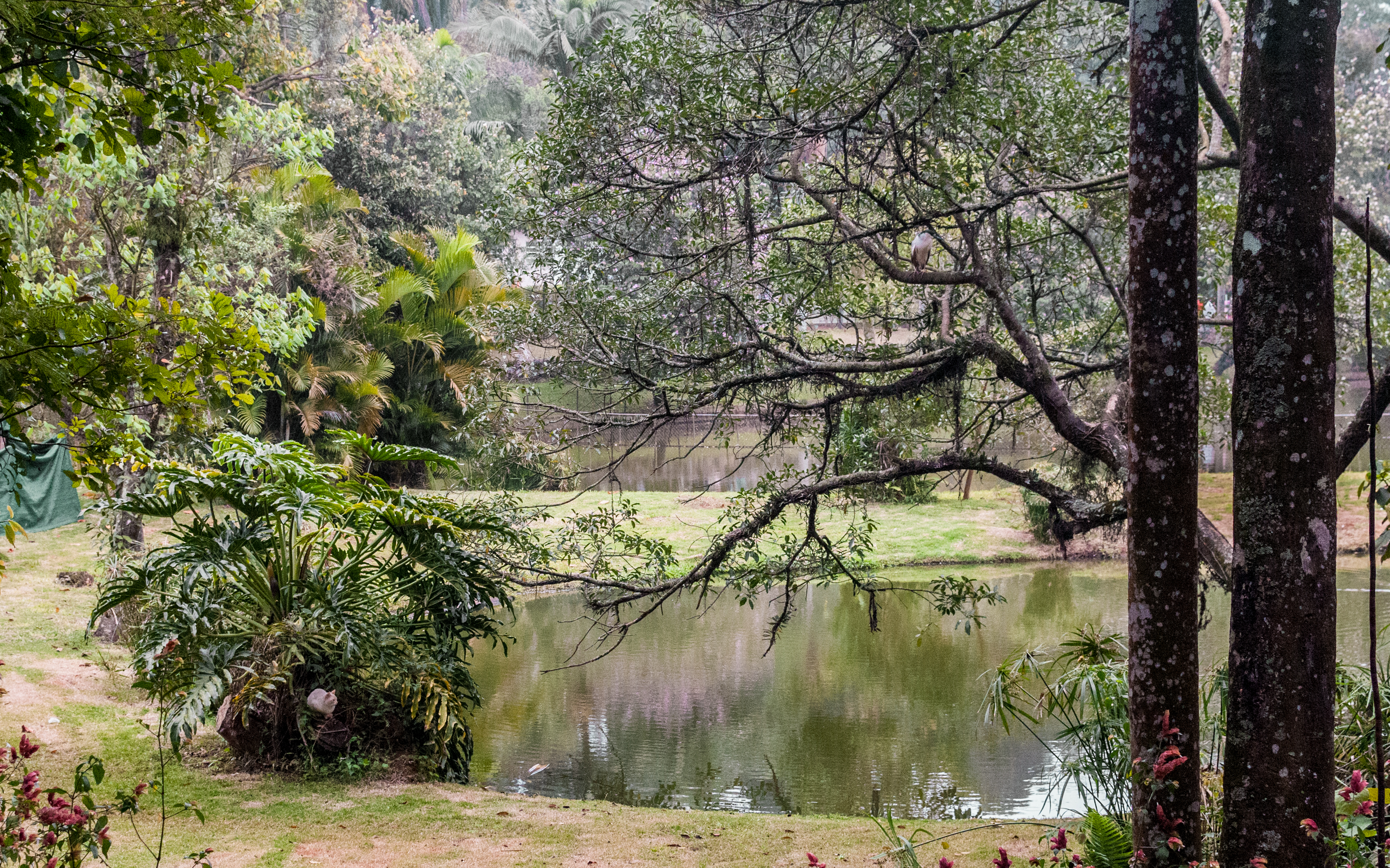
Parts of the Ipiranga Brook

== Infrastructure ==
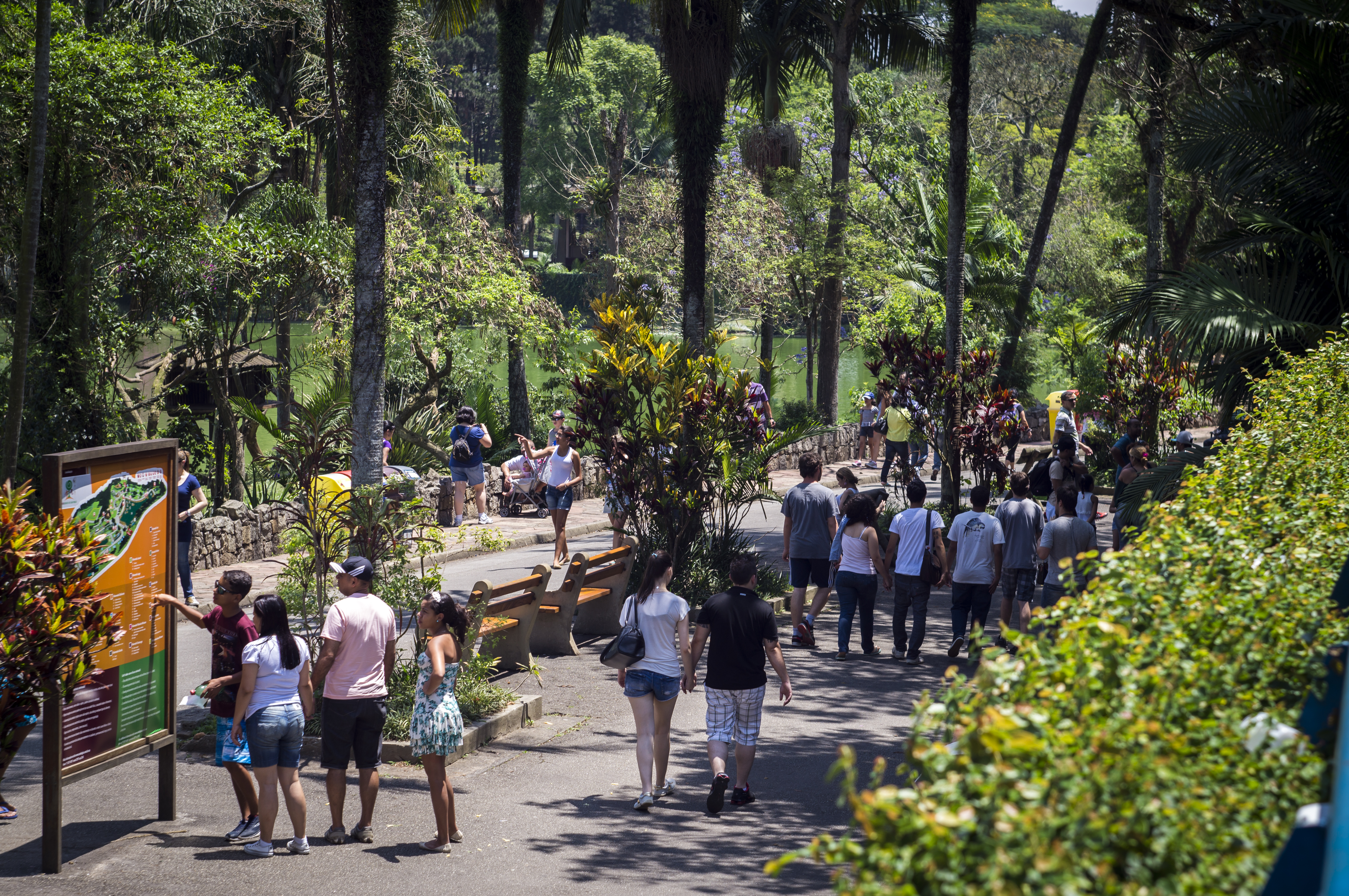
Visitors at the Zoo in 2013

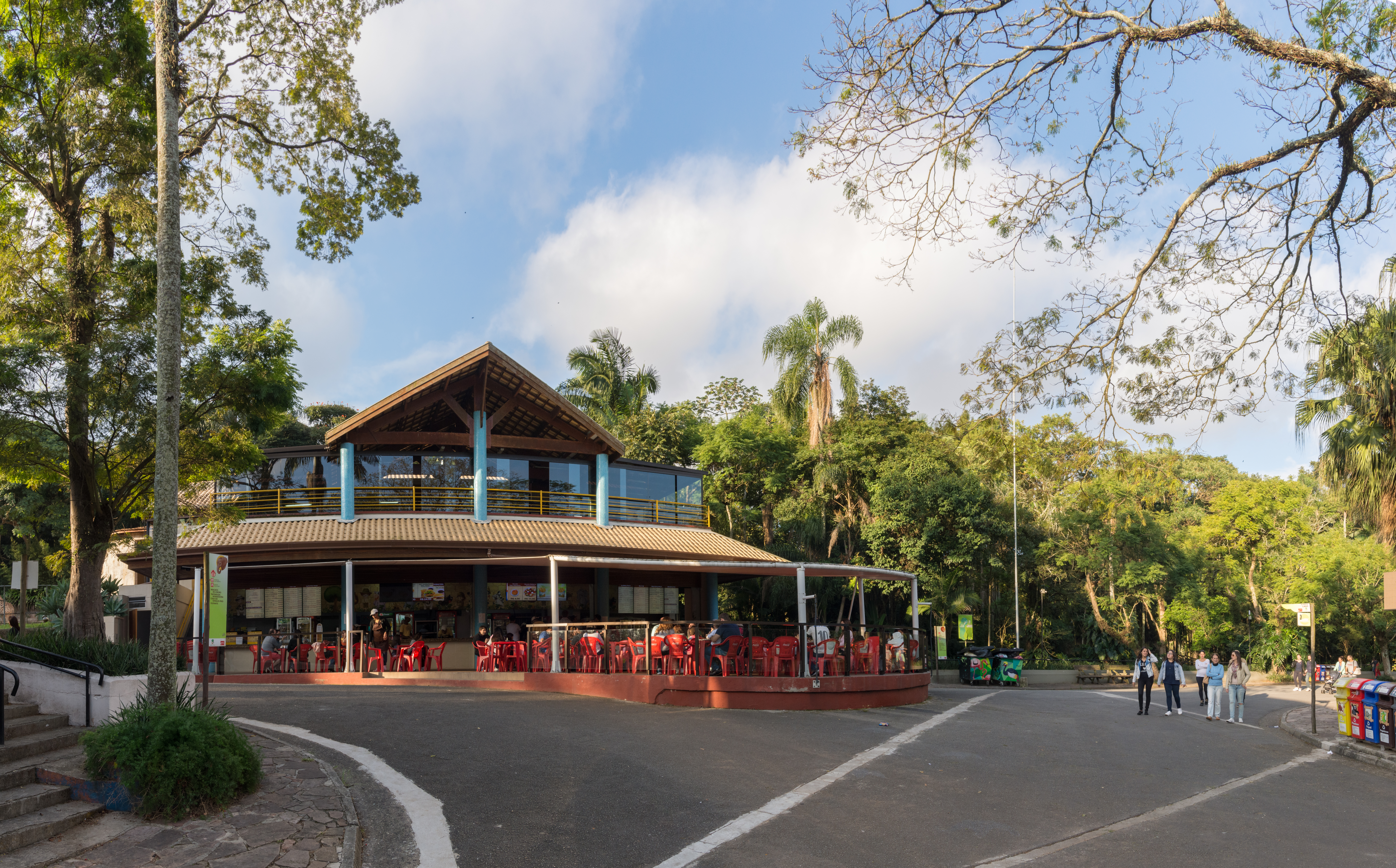
Restaurant area

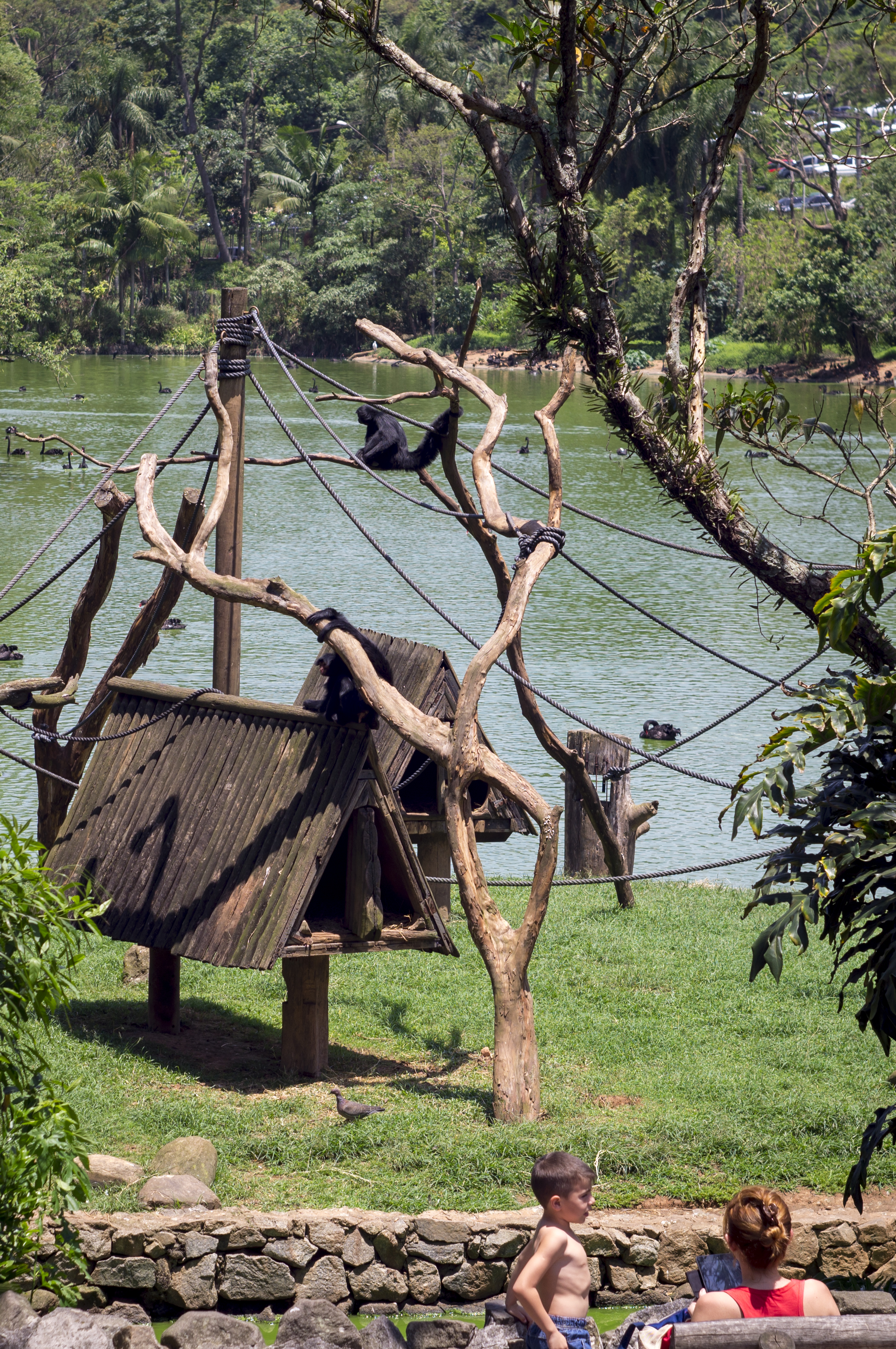
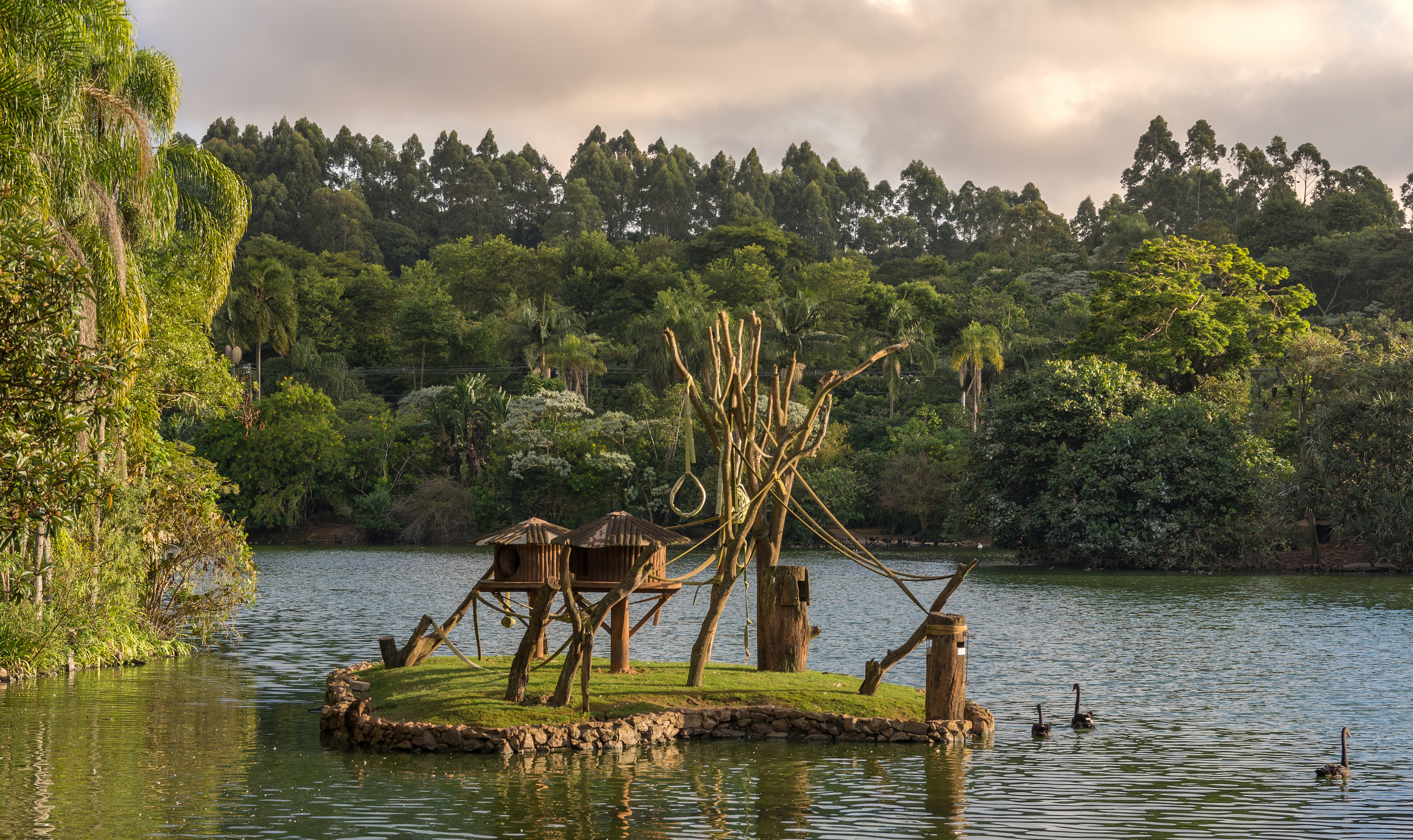
Monkey islands in the zoo

Spanning 824,529 m^{2} (8,875,160 sq ft) and mostly covered by Atlantic Forest, the park is home to the spring of the historic Ipiranga Brook, whose waters form several lakes that are vital to many specimens of exotic, native and migratory birds.

There are more than 3,200 animals on display, including 102 species of mammals, 216 species of birds, 95 species of reptiles, 15 species of amphibians and 16 species of invertebrates. The latter are kept in enclosures and terrariums that resemble their natural habitats. Rare species are also found, such as: southern white rhinoceros, Spix's macaw, Lear's macaw, lion tamarin and others.

The facility also promotes monthly scheduled night tours.

The Zoo has several infrastructure services and visitor assistance, such as:

- 3 snack bars;
- Parking for 2,000 vehicles;
- Photo shop;
- Diaper changing room;
- Souvenir shops;
- Tours in original and restored 1930s garden cars;
- 4 restroom sets separated by gender;
- Own security system;
- D. Pedro Space, for holding events.

=== Farm ===
Since 1982, the park the park has had a farm intended for producing food for its animals and breeding some species in a semi-extensive regime.

This farm comprises an area of 574 hectares (1,420 acres) between Sorocaba, Araçoiaba da Serra and Salto de Pirapora. The farm's annual production is about 1,200 tons of food, which are intended for the more than 3,500 animals in the park, including the production of hay and silage for the dry season months. In addition, it is responsible for supplying raw materials for construction, renovation and enclosure fencing; providing wood, sapés, bamboo, seedlings and bales.

The farm has an implemented and certified Environmental Management System that continuously monitors all activities, providing better control of production and traceability of the food produced, from cultivation to consumption. As an agricultural property with ISO 14001 certification, the farm has drawn the attention of technical and higher education institutions, as well as the press, which has requested visits to learn about its Environmental Management System and its approach to production and environmental care.

Since the mid-1990s, the farm began to receive wild animals in large enclosures and abundant forages were determining factors for it to host the breeding of species such as Damara Zebra, Greater Kudu, Oryx and Waterbuck. As the Zoo is located in a park with no possibility of expanding its area, the farm is the main alternative for breeding these species.

== Projects ==
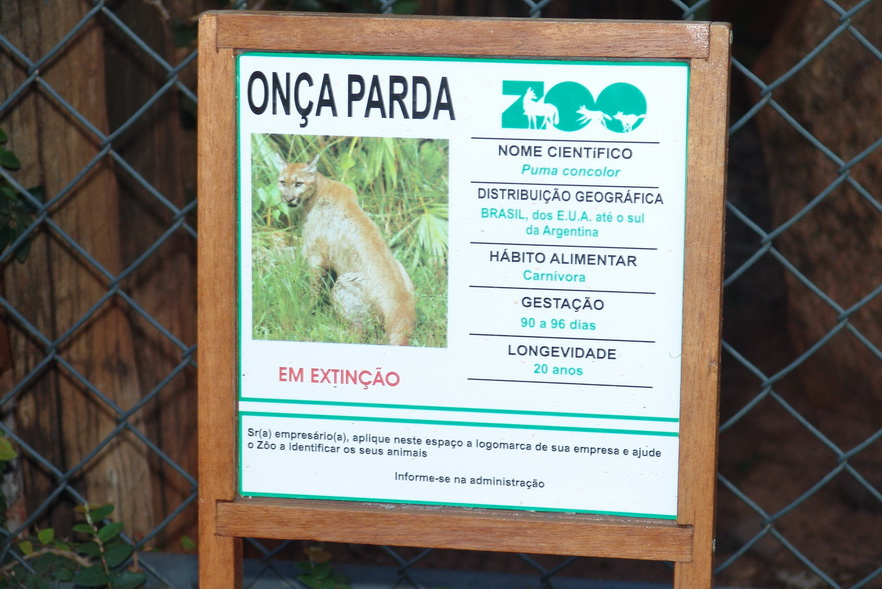
The “Triângulo Mineiro Cougar” Project monitors the feline in the region. Monitoring carried out over 10 years of studies made great discoveries for the conservation of the second-largest feline in Brazil.

The São Paulo Zoo is associated with the Cerrado Mammals Conservation Program (PCMC) which consists of a group of professionals who create projects with the aim of conserving threatened mammals in a region of Minas Gerais and southwestern Goiás. Currently, the Cerrado Mammals Conservation Program takes part in four primary projects: Diversity and Conservation of Mammals in the Serra de Caldas Novas State Park, Ecology and Conservation of the Hoary Fox, Triângulo Mineiro Cougar and the Conservation of Mammals on the Highways and Railways of Central Brazil Project. All these projects are designated for the care of species in this region, preserving its fauna.

One of the best projects of the Zoo is the nursery, developed (around the 2000s) to care for cubs abandoned or rejected by their mothers. It also includes electric brooders and incubation room for eggs of birds and reptiles. As a way to replace the affection and coziness of the mothers, the biologists and keepers of the Zoo feed the cubs every two hours, including during nightime. Each cub receives food through syringes, as it helps them feed and more frequently. The feed is imported from North America, and as it is artificial, it does not have all the enzymes that the cubs need; therefore, they are fed more often than they would be by their mothers. After a week, the feedings can be more spaced out as they gain a little more resistance.

=== Research ===
The São Paulo Zoo has a strong presence in the scientific community, especially in matters related to Brazilian wildlife issues. It maintains technical-scientific contacts with other research centers, including the Butantan Institute, the Biological Institute of São Paulo and the Adolfo Lutz Institute, as well as through contracts signed with the University of São Paulo, "Júlio de Mesquita Filho" State University (UNESP), Federal University of Campina Grande (PB), State University of Londrina (PR) and the Federal University of Santa Maria (RS).

The Zoo has a professional qualification program for students and researchers in the areas of biology, veterinary medicine and animal husbandry; and carries out scientific research programs and environmental awareness of the population through visitors.

=== Internships ===
The São Paulo Zoo offers programs for those who wish to be an intern, volunteer or to develop a research project at the Zoo. Volunteering is aimed at people who want to dedicate some time to wildlife; the activities developed by volunteers must follow the Volunteering Program, which presents a regulation responsible for defining the norms and conduct of the program.

The professional improvement program (PAP) is a way to contribute to professionals trained in the area of maintenance and conservation of wildlife or management of natural resources, and is offered exclusively to biologists, veterinarians, animal husbandry specialists, agronomists, environmental managers and professionals seeking improvement in the areas of Wildlife Biology; Education for Conservation; Veterinary Medicine of Wild Animals; Behavioral and Environmental Enrichment of Wild Animals; Nutrition and Feeding Management of Wild Animals; Environmental Management System and Quality in Zoos; Operation, Control and Environmental Monitoring in Zoos; Environmental Education and Integrated Management applied to Rural Production (Rural Production Division); Molecular biology and Microbiology; Assisted Reproduction; and Biotechnology and Clinical analysis. The professional master's degree is done by the Graduate Program in Fauna Conservation (PPG-CFau), a joint action with UFSCar. The program includes practical classes at the Zoo itself and theory classes at UFSCar in Sorocaba.

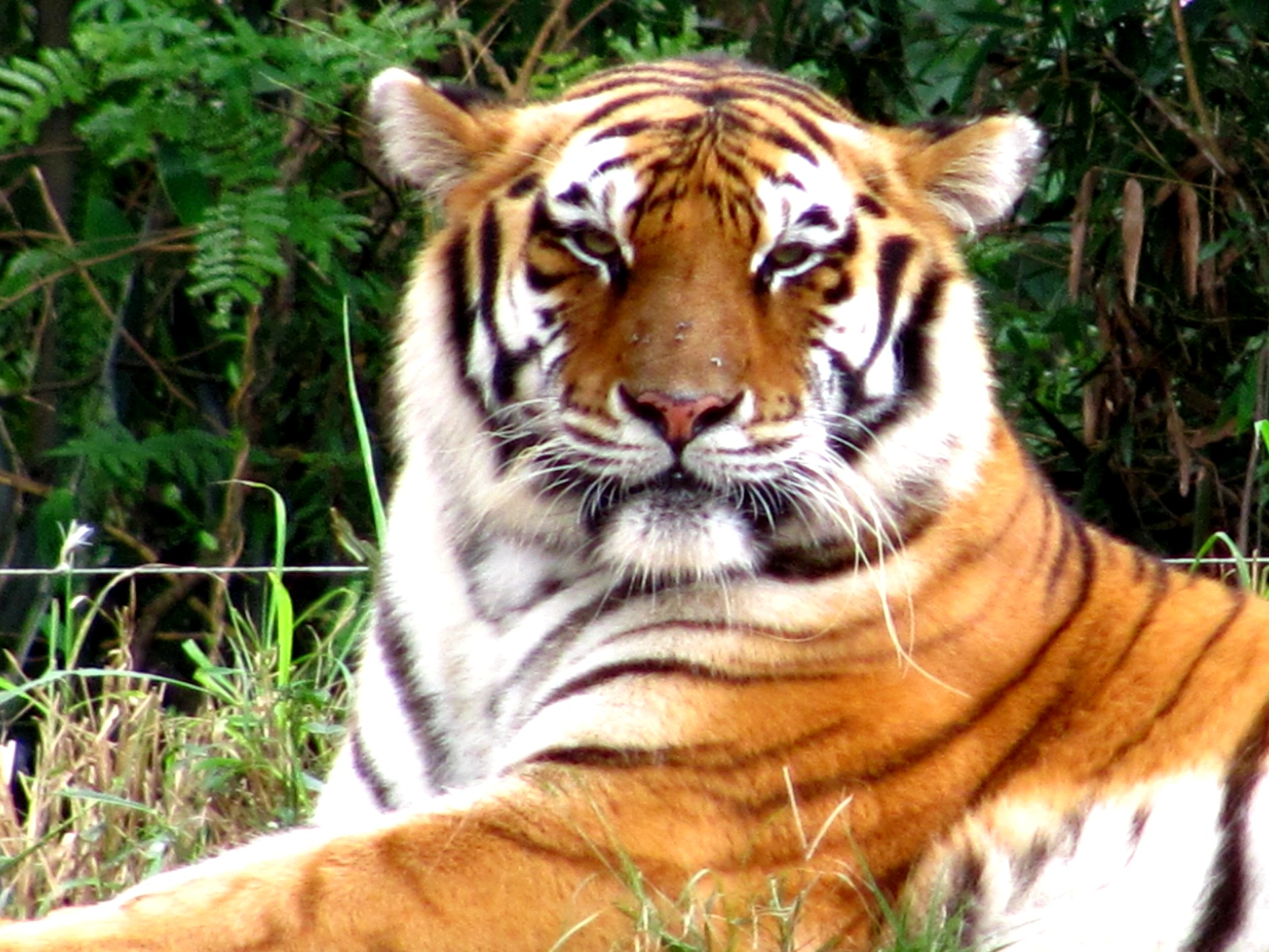
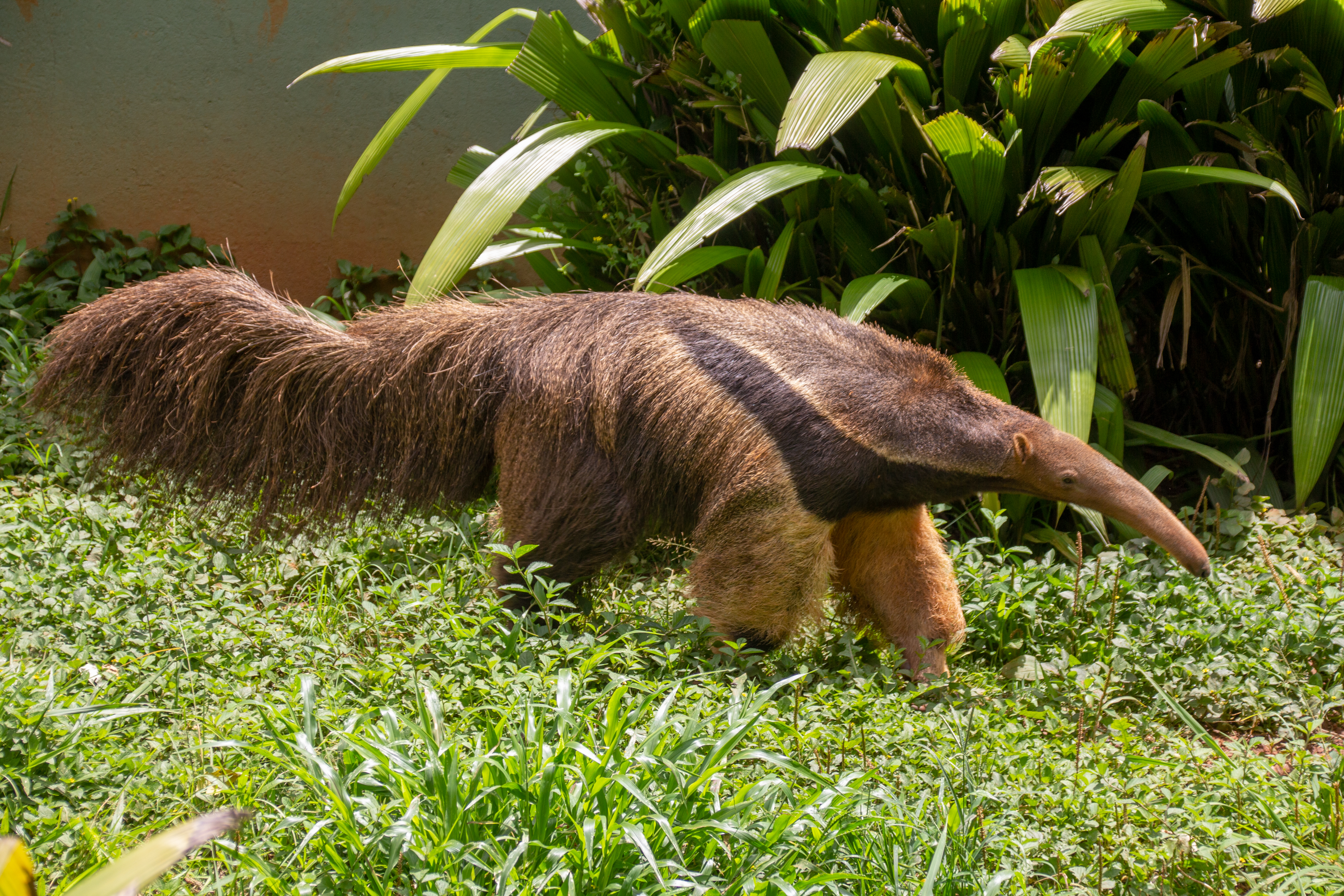
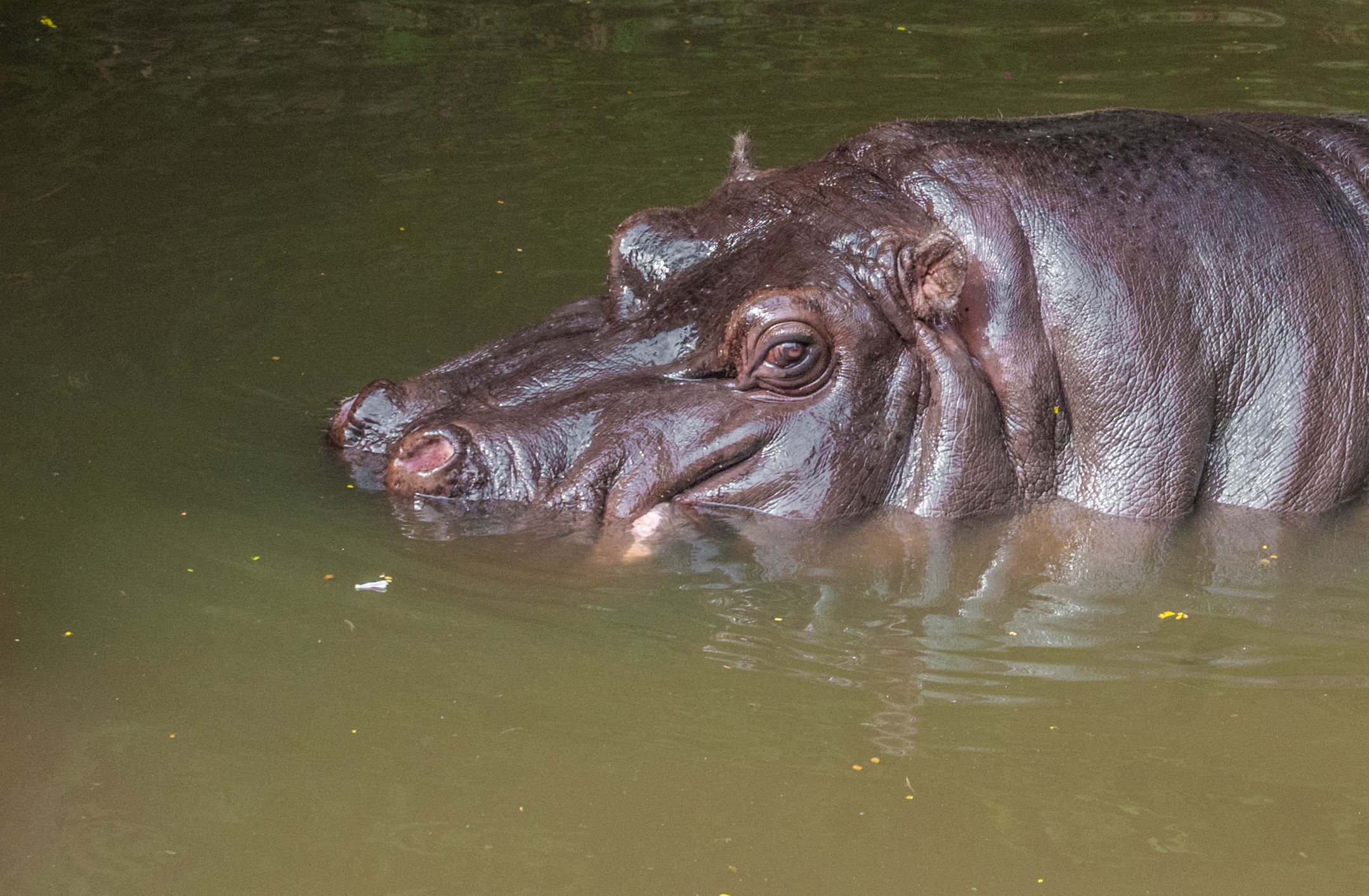
The “Animal Behavioral Enrichment Program”, which aims to encourage captive animals to develop more natural behaviors and better explore their enclosures.

== Events ==
In 2003, the São Paulo Zoo Foundation began offering night tours, giving visitors the opportunity to learn about the habits and mysteries of nocturnal animals. These animals are often less active during the day because they are more active at night. This tour also features appearances of native fauna, such as opossums, owls and bats that are seen roaming freely through the park. The purpose of the program is to allow observing animals with nocturnal habits, while there is also stimulation for the animals so that they feel more comfortable to explore their enclosure more and develop their habits in more natural ways.

There are some night attractions such as the presentation of the bird of prey, so that visitors learn about the characteristics of this animal and a little environmental education. Along the route in the park, it is possible for visitors to see the animals up close such as giant anteaters, jaguars, lions, tigers, wolves, white tigers and hippopotamuses being fed by the monitors. The “Animal Behavioral Enrichment Program” applied by the zoo encourages animals in captivity to develop natural behaviors, thus better exploring their enclosures, which makes the tour even more interesting.

In 2016, the park received some attractions for a school vacation special in the month of July. The space featured artistic and educational attractions and also received new animals in the second half of the month; among them were the golden lancehead, a species of snake, and the alcatraz snouted Treefrog. The Abaré Space was created, a place for visitors to learn a little more about indigenous culture. Another space created was Vida de Bicho, to understand a little more about the routine life of animals.

The zoo's anthill received special attractions and the puppet theater performed presentations with the play "Once Upon a Time", another educational play by the military police called "Educating for Traffic in a Fun Way" and, finally, the play "Living with Health" taught a little about how to improve eating habits and be healthier.

=== Zoo Safari ===
The Zoo Safari was inaugurated on June 5, 2001 and is located on Avenida do Cursino, right next to the São Paulo Zoo. It has a total area of 80,000 square metres (860,000 sq ft). Dozens of wild animals are presented to visitors on a route of approximately 4 kilometers in length.

The structure of the Zoo Safari allows visitors the opportunity to observe deer, capuchin monkeys, spider monkeys, ostriches, camels, llamas, lions, tigers and various other exotic animals up close. Some of the mentioned species also offer the opportunity to be fed by the public with the feed sold at the Zoo Safari itself.

The tour through the Zoo Safari can be done by means of the visitors' own vehicles or, alternatively, by means of the vans available at the park site. Another alternative to visit the Zoo Safari is during the tour through the São Paulo Zoo by means of a Portal that connects the two Parks, this portal is located on Alameda Leão, next to the dromedary enclosure.

In 2020, the public São Paulo Zoo Foundation was handed over to private initiative.

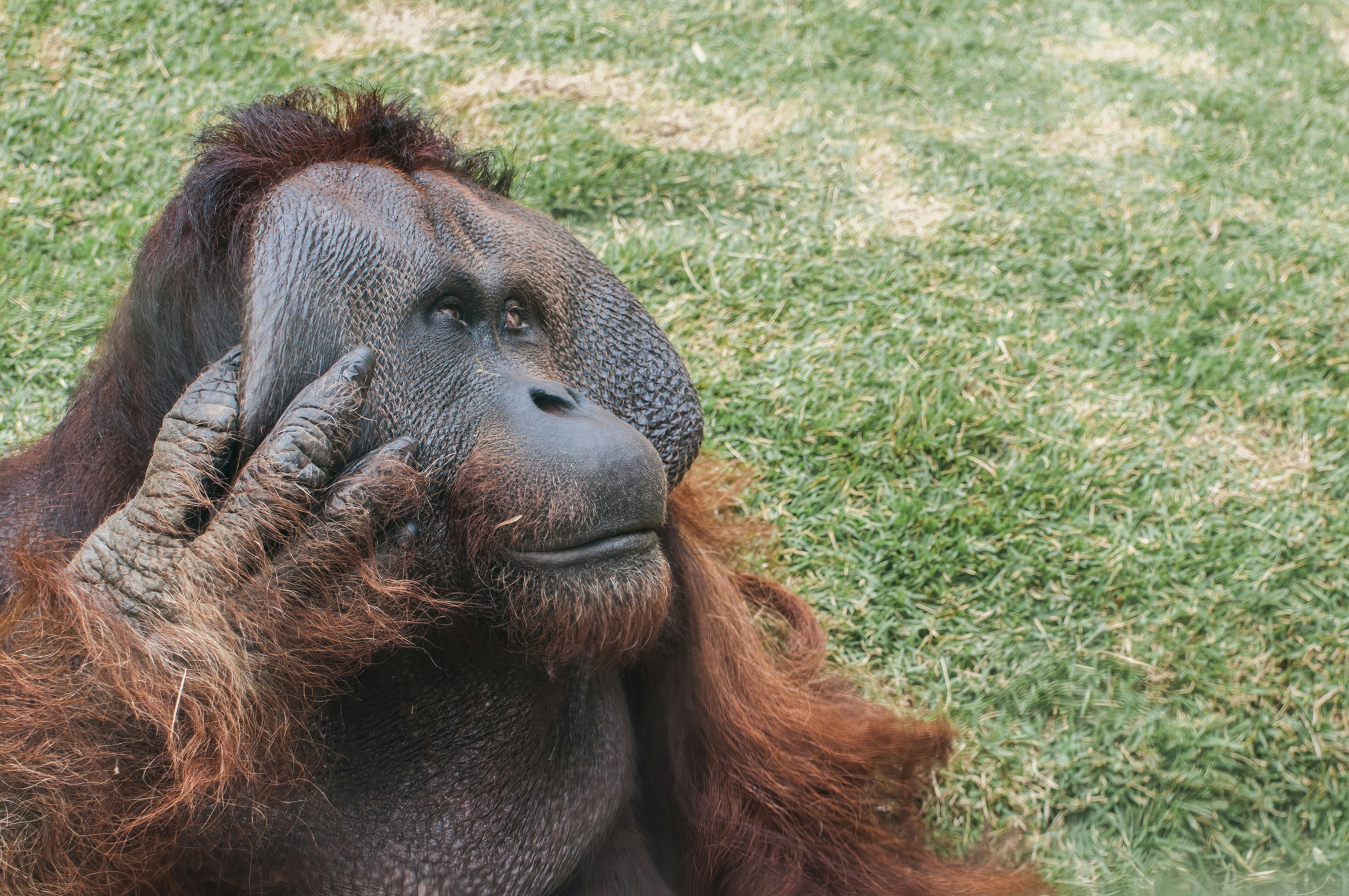
Sumatran orangutan (Pongo abelii) at the São Paulo Zoo.

== Orca Zoo Bridge ==
The Ponte Orca Zoo service consists of an exclusive line of themed buses that depart from the Jabaquara Station of the São Paulo Metro towards the Zoo. The aim is to enable visitors to access the site via public transport. To board it, you must purchase the package that includes the ticket and round-trip fare at the exclusive sales point inside the Jabaquara Metropolitan Terminal, adjacent to the station.

== See also ==
- Botanical Garden of São Paulo
- Fontes do Ipiranga Biological Reserve
- São Paulo Aquarium
