= Stibasoma =

Scientific classification
- Kingdom: Animalia
- Phylum: Arthropoda
- Clade: Pancrustacea
- Class: Insecta
- Order: Diptera
- Family: Tabanidae
- Subfamily: Tabaninae
- Tribe: Diachlorini
- Genus: Stibasoma; Schiner, 1867

Type species
- Tabanus theotaenia Wiedemann, 1828

Genus of flies

Stibasoma is a genus of horse flies in the family Tabanidae.

== Species ==
- Stibasoma apicimacula Fairchild, 1940
- Stibasoma aureoguttatum Kröber, 1931
- Stibasoma bella Limeira-de-Oliveira, 2005
- Stibasoma bicolor Bigot, 1892
- Stibasoma bifenestrata Philip, 1966
- Stibasoma chionostigma (Osten Sacken, 1886)
- Stibasoma currani Philip, 1943
- Stibasoma festivum (Wiedemann, 1828)
- Stibasoma flaviventre (Macquart, 1848)
- Stibasoma fulvohirtum (Wiedemann, 1828)
- Stibasoma giganteum (Lutz, 1913)
- Stibasoma leucopleurale Barretto, 1947
- Stibasoma lutzi Barretto, 1947
- Stibasoma manauensis Turcatel, Rafael & Carvalho, 2020
- Stibasoma ruthae Turcatel, Rafael & Carvalho, 2020
- Stibasoma sulfurotaenium Kröber, 1931
- Stibasoma theotaenia (Wiedemann, 1828)
- Stibasoma willistoni Lutz, 1907
