= Fidena =

Scientific classification
- Kingdom: Animalia
- Phylum: Arthropoda
- Class: Insecta
- Order: Diptera
- Family: Tabanidae
- Subfamily: Pangoniinae
- Tribe: Scionini
- Genus: Fidena; Walker, 1850)

Type species
- Pangonia leucopogon Wiedemann, 1828

Synonyms
- Melpia Walker, 1850; Sackenimyia Bigot, 1879; Erephosis Bigot, 1890; Erephrosis Ricardo, 1900; Ionopsis Lutz, 1909; Phaeoneura Lutz, 1909; Ionopis Lutz, 1909; Epipsila Lutz, 1909; Bombylopsis Lutz & Neiva, 1909; Bombylomyia Lutz, 1911; Bombylomorpha Lutz, 1911; Bombylomorpha Borgmeier, 1933; Chrysochiton Lutz & Castro, 1936

Genus of flies

Fidena is a genus of horse-fly in the tribe Scionini.

== Species ==
- Fidena abominata Philip, 1941
- Fidena adnaticornis Castro, 1945
- Fidena albibarba Enderlein, 1925
- Fidena albitaeniata (Lutz, 1911)
- Fidena analis (Fabricius, 1805)
- Fidena atra Lutz & Castro, 1936
- Fidena atripes (Röder, 1886)
- Fidena aureopygia Kröber, 1931
- Fidena aureosericea Kröber, 1931
- Fidena auribarba (Enderlein, 1925)
- Fidena auricincta (Lutz & Neiva, 1909)
- Fidena aurifasciata Enderlein, 1925
- Fidena aurimaculata (Macquart, 1838)
- Fidena auripes (Ricardo, 1900)
- Fidena aurulenta Gorayeb, 1986
- Fidena basilaris (Wiedemann, 1828)
- Fidena bicolor Kröber, 1931
- Fidena bistriga Fairchild & Rafael, 1985
- Fidena bocainensis (Lutz & Castro, 1936)
- Fidena brachycephala Kröber, 1931
- Fidena brasiliensis Kröber, 1931
- Fidena brevistria (Lutz, 1909)
- Fidena callipyga Castro, 1945
- Fidena campolarguense Bassi, 1997
- Fidena castanea (Perty, 1833)
- Fidena castaneiventris Kröber, 1934
- Fidena coscaroni Philip, 1968
- Fidena decipiens Kröber, 1931
- Fidena eriomera (Macquart, 1838)
- Fidena eriomeroides (Lutz, 1909)
- Fidena erythronotata (Bigot, 1892)
- Fidena flavicrinis (Lutz, 1909)
- Fidena flavipennis Kröber, 1931
- Fidena flavipennis ssp. fisheri Philip, 1978
- Fidena flavipennis ssp. vallensis Wilkerson, 1979
- Fidena flavithorax (Kröber, 1930)
- Fidena florisuga (Lutz, 1911)
- Fidena foetterlei (Lutz, 1909)
- Fidena freemani Barretto, 1957
- Fidena fulgifascies Barretto, 1957
- Fidena fulvithorax (Wiedemann, 1821)
- Fidena fulvitibialis (Ricardo, 1900)
- Fidena fumifera (Walker, 1854)
- Fidena fusca (Thunberg, 1827)
- Fidena griseithorax Burger, 2002
- Fidena haywardi Philip, 1968
- Fidena howardi Fairchild, 1941
- Fidena kroeberi Fairchild, 1971
- Fidena laterina (Rondani, 1851)
- Fidena latifrons Kröber, 1931
- Fidena leonina (Lutz, 1909)
- Fidena leucopogon (Wiedemann, 1828)
- Fidena lingens (Wiedemann, 1828)
- Fidena lissorhina Gorayeb & Fairchild, 1987
- Fidena longipalpis Enderlein, 1925
- Fidena loricornis Kröber, 1931
- Fidena maculipennis Kröber, 1931
- Fidena marginalis (Wiedemann, 1830)
- Fidena mattogrossensis (Lutz, 1912)
- Fidena mirabilis Lutz, 1911
- Fidena morio (Wulp, 1881)
- Fidena neglecta Kröber, 1931
- Fidena nigricans (Lutz, 1909)
- Fidena nigripennis (Guerin, 1835)
- Fidena nigrivittata (Macquart, 1850)
- Fidena nitens (Bigot, 1892)
- Fidena niveibarba Kröber, 1931
- Fidena nubiapex (Lutz, 1911)
- Fidena obscuripes Kröber, 1931
- Fidena ochracea (Kröber, 1930)
- Fidena ochrapogon Wilkerson, 1979
- Fidena oldroydi (Barretto, 1957)
- Fidena opaca (Brèthes, 1910)
- Fidena palidetarsis Kröber, 1930
- Fidena pallidula Kröber, 1933
- Fidena penicillata (Bigot, 1892)
- Fidena pessoai Barretto, 1957
- Fidena philipi Coscarón, 2001
- Fidena pseudoaurimaculata (Lutz, 1909)
- Fidena pubescens (Lutz, 1909)
- Fidena pusilla (Lutz, 1909)
- Fidena rhinophora (Bellardi, 1859)
- Fidena rubrithorax Kröber, 1931
- Fidena rufibasis Kröber, 1931
- Fidena ruficornis (Kröber, 1931)
- Fidena rufohirta (Walker, 1848)
- Fidena rufopilosus (Ricardo, 1900)
- Fidena schildi (Hine, 1925)
- Fidena silvatica (Brèthes, 1920)
- Fidena soledadei (Lutz, 1911)
- Fidena sorbens (Wiedemann, 1828)
- Fidena splendens (Lutz, 1911)
- Fidena submetallica (Brèthes, 1910)
- Fidena sulfurea Wilkerson, 1979
- Fidena tenuistria (Walker, 1848)
- Fidena trapidoi Fairchild, 1953
- Fidena trinidadensis Fairchild & Aitken, 1960
- Fidena venosa (Wiedemann, 1821)
- Fidena winthemi (Wiedemann, 1819)
- Fidena zonalis Kröber, 1931
