= AquaRio =

Marine Aquarium of Rio de Janeiro "AquaRio"
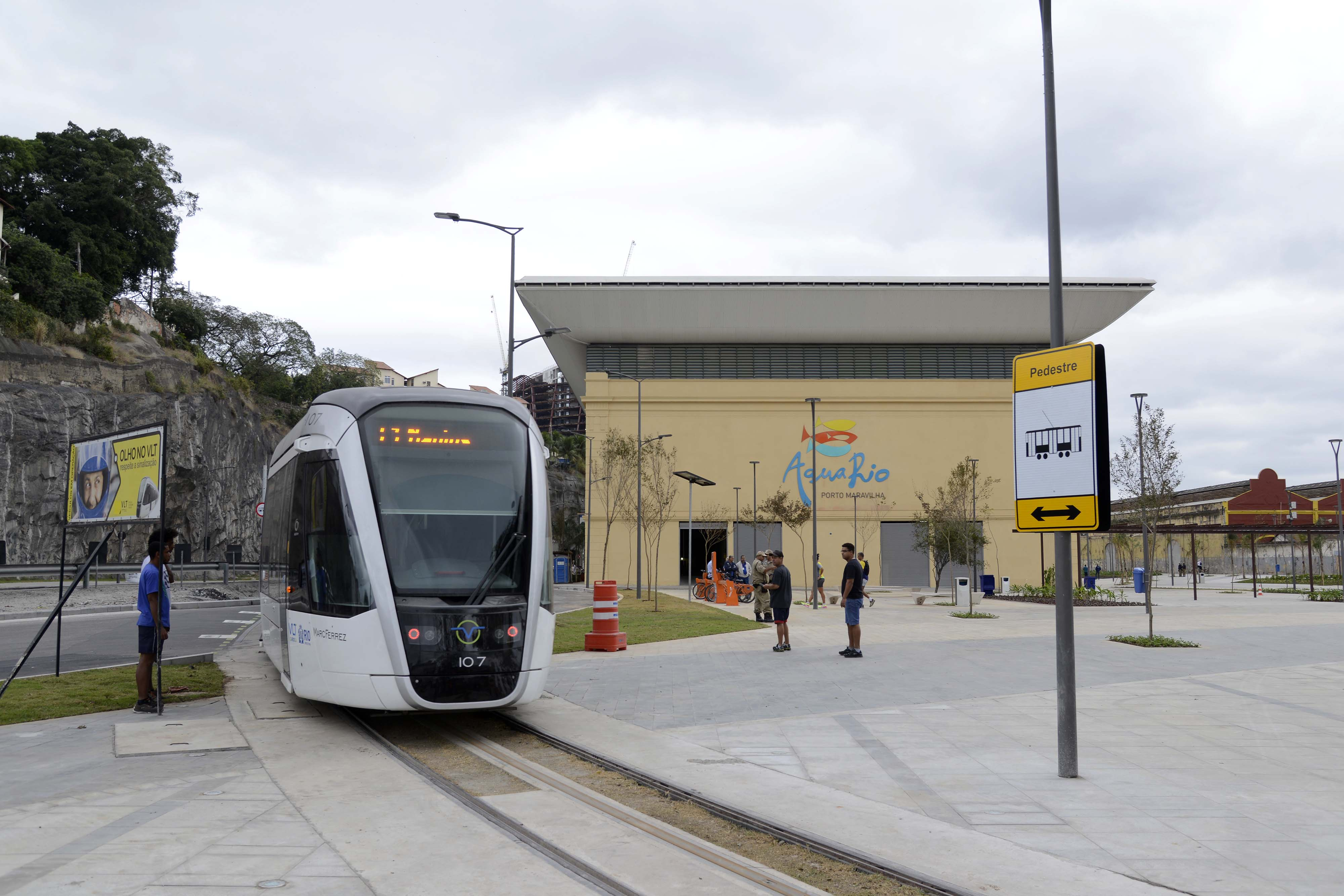
- AquaRio
- Interactive map of Marine Aquarium of Rio de Janeiro "AquaRio"
- 22.8931°S 43.1927°W
- Date opened: October 31, 2016
- Location: Rio de Janeiro, Rio de Janeiro, Brazil
- Land area: 26,000 square metres (280,000 sq ft)
- No. of animals: More than 10,000
- No. of species: 350
- Total volume of tanks: 4.5 million liters (990,000 imp gal; 1,200,000 U.S. gal)
- Website: www.aquariomarinhodorio.com.br

The Marine Aquarium of Rio de Janeiro (Portuguese: Aquário Marinho do Rio de Janeiro), or AquaRio, is a public aquarium located in the Gamboa neighborhood, in the port zone of Rio de Janeiro, Brazil. With a constructed area of about 26,000 square metres (280,000 sq ft), it is located to the west of Muhammad Ali Square. It is considered the largest marine aquarium in South America.

It was inaugurated on October 31, 2016, in a ceremony that was attended by the former minister of Tourism, Marx Beltrão. The public aquarium was made at Porto Maravilha, an urban operation that aims to revitalize the Port Zone of Rio de Janeiro.

The building occupied by AquaRio has a total of 5 floors and 28 tanks with various types of fish. In the tanks, about 4.5 million liters of salt water are stored, in addition to 8 thousand animals of 350 different species. The building formerly belonged to Companhia Brasileira de Armazenamento (Cibrazem), now Companhia Nacional de Abastecimento (CONAB).

== Main features ==
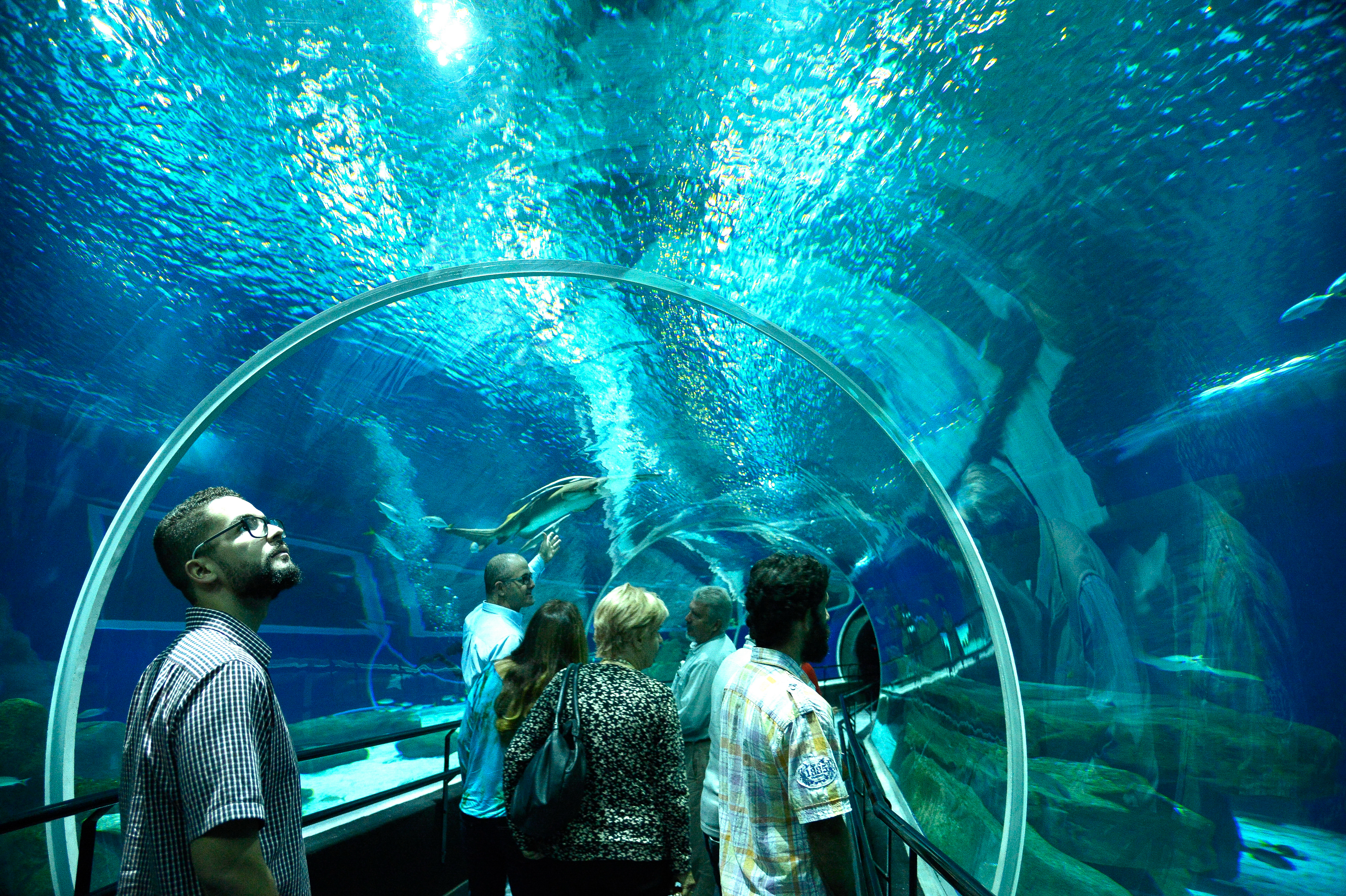
Tunnel inside in one of the aquariums

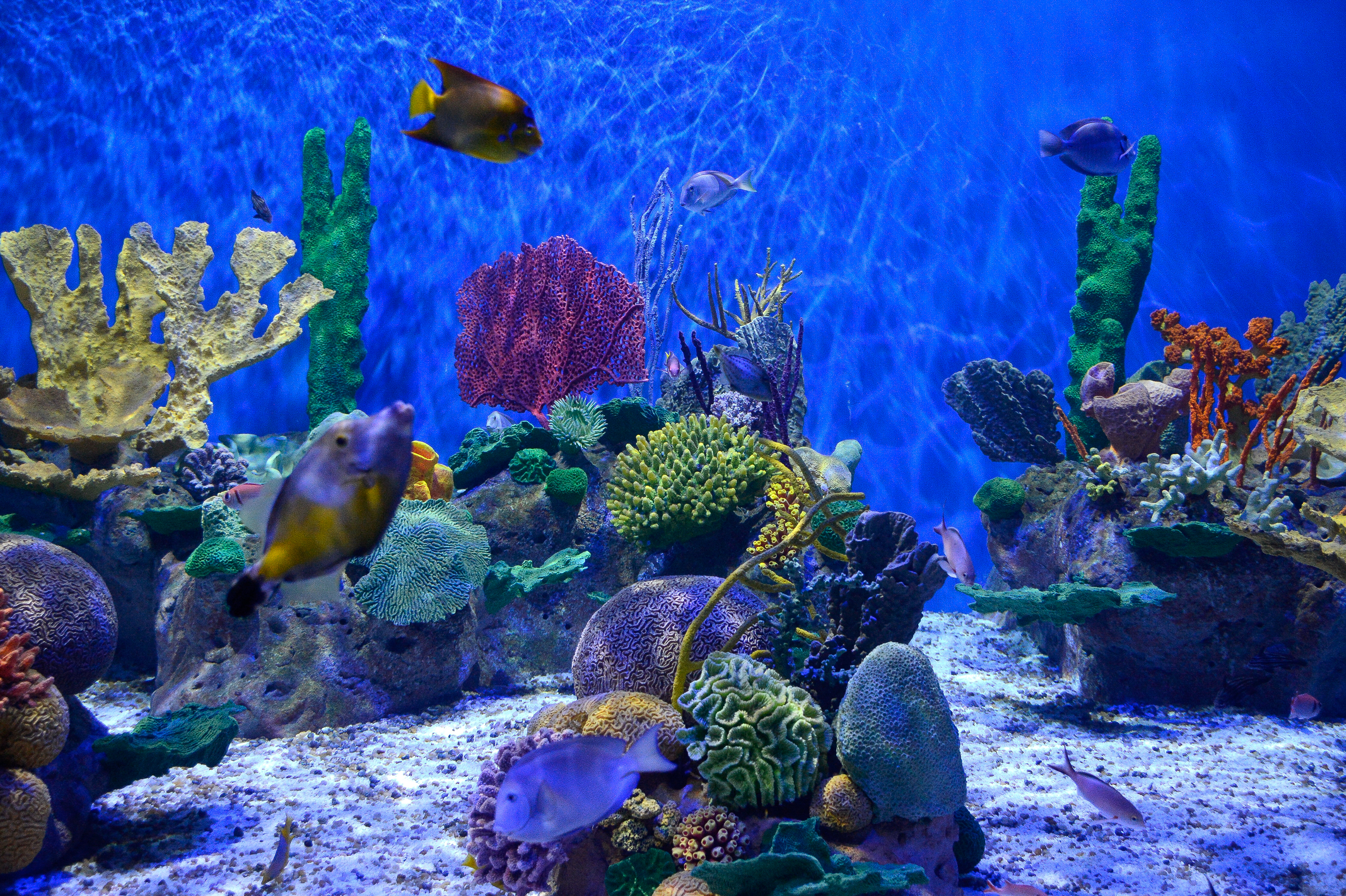
Multicolor fishes and corals in one of the AquaRio tanks.

AquaRio brings together more than 10,000 animals from 350 different species from all oceans. Among the main species present in the aquarium are: the nurse shark (Ginglymostoma cirratum); the whitetip reef shark (Triaenodon obesus); the blacktip reef shark (Carcharhinus melanopterus); and the sand tiger shark (Carcharias taurus). The fish are distributed in 28 enclosures, which gather a total of 4.5 million liters of salt water.

In addition to the visit to the tanks, AquaRio allows the visitor to perform the following additional activities, subject to charge separately: "Sleeping in AquaRio", where the visitor can spend a night in the tunnel that passes in the middle of the Great Ocean Tank; the "Diving of the Ocean Tank", where the visitor can dive into one of the tanks; the "Virtual Fish", where the visitor can create a virtual friend at the beginning of the tour and interact with him along the circuit; "Behind the Scenes", where the visitor can see up close the equipment that treat the water of the enclosures, the work of the biologists and the way of realizing the feeding of the fish.

The AquaRio visitor can also enjoy the following attractions: the Virtual Aquarium, a digital aquarium with fish created by visitors; the Science Museum, composed of the Plankton Station and the Shell Exhibition; Surf, a space dedicated to the surf elaborated by the surfer Rico de Souza. As part of its structure, AquaRio has a café, a scientific research center, a parking lot and a souvenir shop, including some kiosks.

=== Solar roof ===
On May 31, 2016, the largest solar roof installed in urban areas of Brazil was inaugurated at AquaRio. Comprising about two thousand solar panels installed in an area of 6 thousand m^{2}, the solar roof will generate about 77 thousand kilowatts of energy per month, equivalent to the monthly consumption of 500 Brazilian homes. The roof reduces the consumption of electricity consumed by the aquarium by up to 30%.

== See also ==
- Tourism in Brazil
- São Paulo Aquarium
