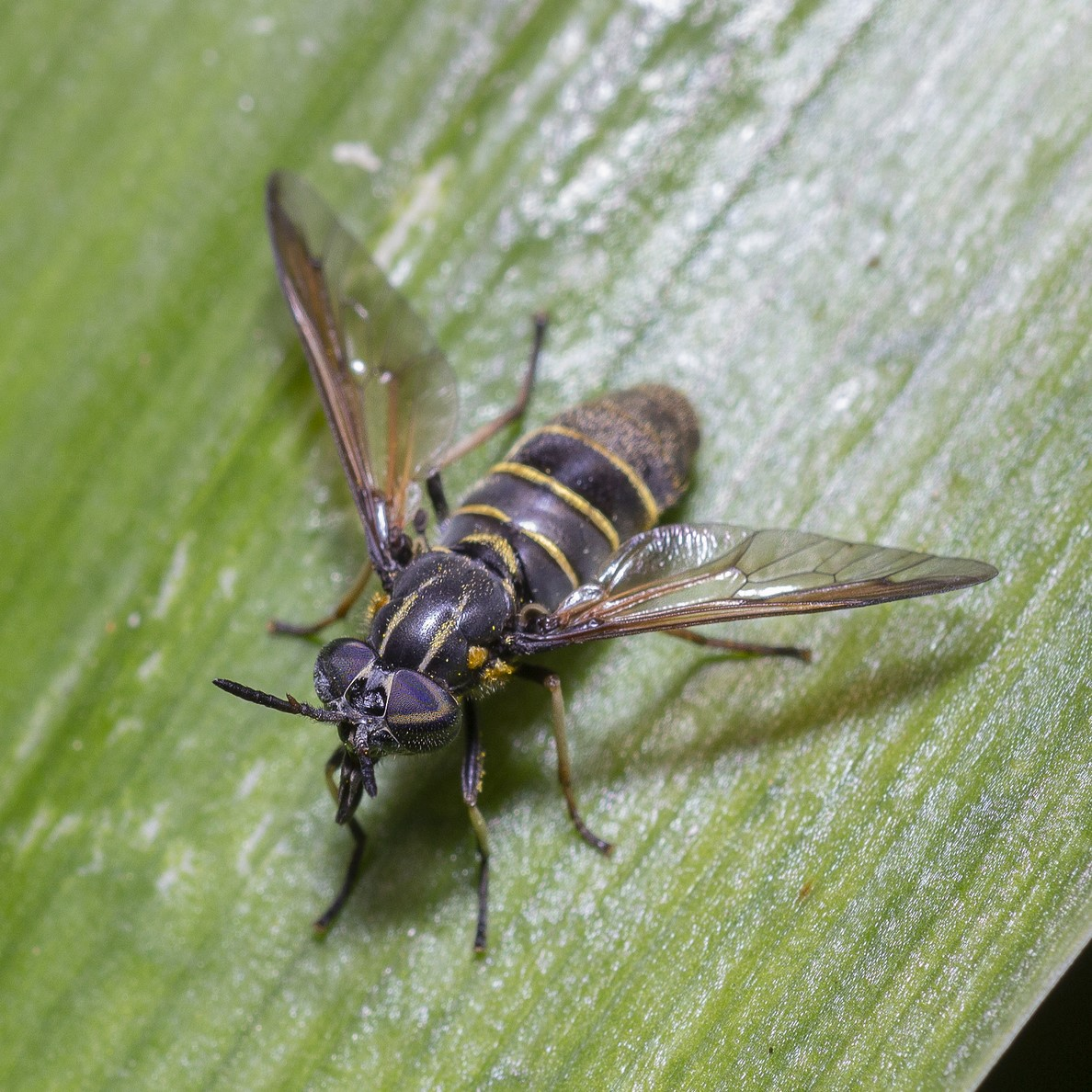
- Acanthocera exstincta

Scientific classification
- Kingdom: Animalia
- Phylum: Arthropoda
- Clade: Pancrustacea
- Class: Insecta
- Order: Diptera
- Family: Tabanidae
- Subfamily: Tabaninae
- Tribe: Diachlorini
- Genus: Acanthocera; Macquart, 1834

Type species
- Tabanus longicornis Fabricius, 1775

Synonyms
- Algemaria Gistel, 1848; Spheciogaster Enderlein, 1922

= Acanthocera =

Genus of flies

Acanthocera is a genus of flies belonging to the family Tabanidae.

The species of this genus are found in South America.

== Species ==
- Acanthocera anacantha Lutz & Neiva, 1915
- Acanthocera aureoscutellata Henriques & Rafael, 1992
- Acanthocera bequaerti (Fairchild, 1964)
- Acanthocera bicincta Henriques & Rafael, 1992
- Acanthocera coarctata (Wiedemann, 1828)
- Acanthocera distincta Henriques & Rafael, 1995
- Acanthocera exstincta (Wiedemann, 1828)
- Acanthocera fairchildi Henriques & Rafael, 1992
- Acanthocera gorayebi Henriques & Rafael, 1992
- Acanthocera inopinatus (Fairchild, 1972)
- Acanthocera intermedia Lutz, 1915
- Acanthocera kroberi Fairchild, 1939
- Acanthocera longicornis (Fabricius, 1775)
- Acanthocera lutzi (Enderlein, 1922)
- Acanthocera marginalis Walker, 1854
- Acanthocera polistiformis Fairchild, 1961
- Acanthocera quinquecincta Lutz, 1915
- Acanthocera vespiformis Burger, 2002
