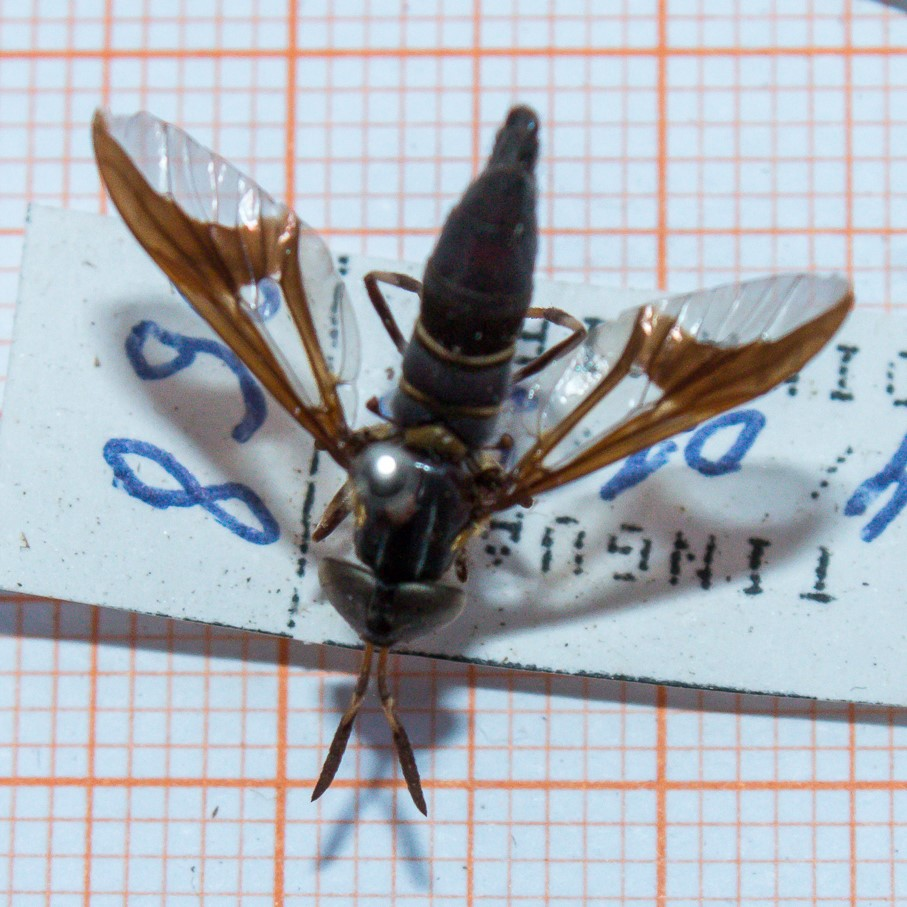

Scientific classification
- Kingdom: Animalia
- Phylum: Arthropoda
- Clade: Pancrustacea
- Class: Insecta
- Order: Diptera
- Family: Tabanidae
- Subfamily: Tabaninae
- Tribe: Diachlorini
- Genus: Acanthocera
- Species: A. longicornis

Binomial name
- Acanthocera longicornis (Fabricius, 1775)

Synonyms
- Tabanus longicornis Fabricius, 1775; Dichelacera longicornis Macquart, 1838; Haematopota triangularis Wiedemann, 1819; Tabanus pictipennis Macquart, 1834

= Acanthocera longicornis =

Species of insect

Acanthocera longicornis is a species of horse fly in the family Tabanidae.

== Distribution ==
It is found in Brazil.
