= Bothrops lutzi =

Conservation status
- Least Concern (IUCN 3.1)

Scientific classification
- Kingdom: Animalia
- Phylum: Chordata
- Class: Reptilia
- Order: Squamata
- Suborder: Serpentes
- Family: Viperidae
- Genus: Bothrops
- Species: B. lutzi

Binomial name
- Bothrops lutzi (Miranda-Ribeiro, 1915)
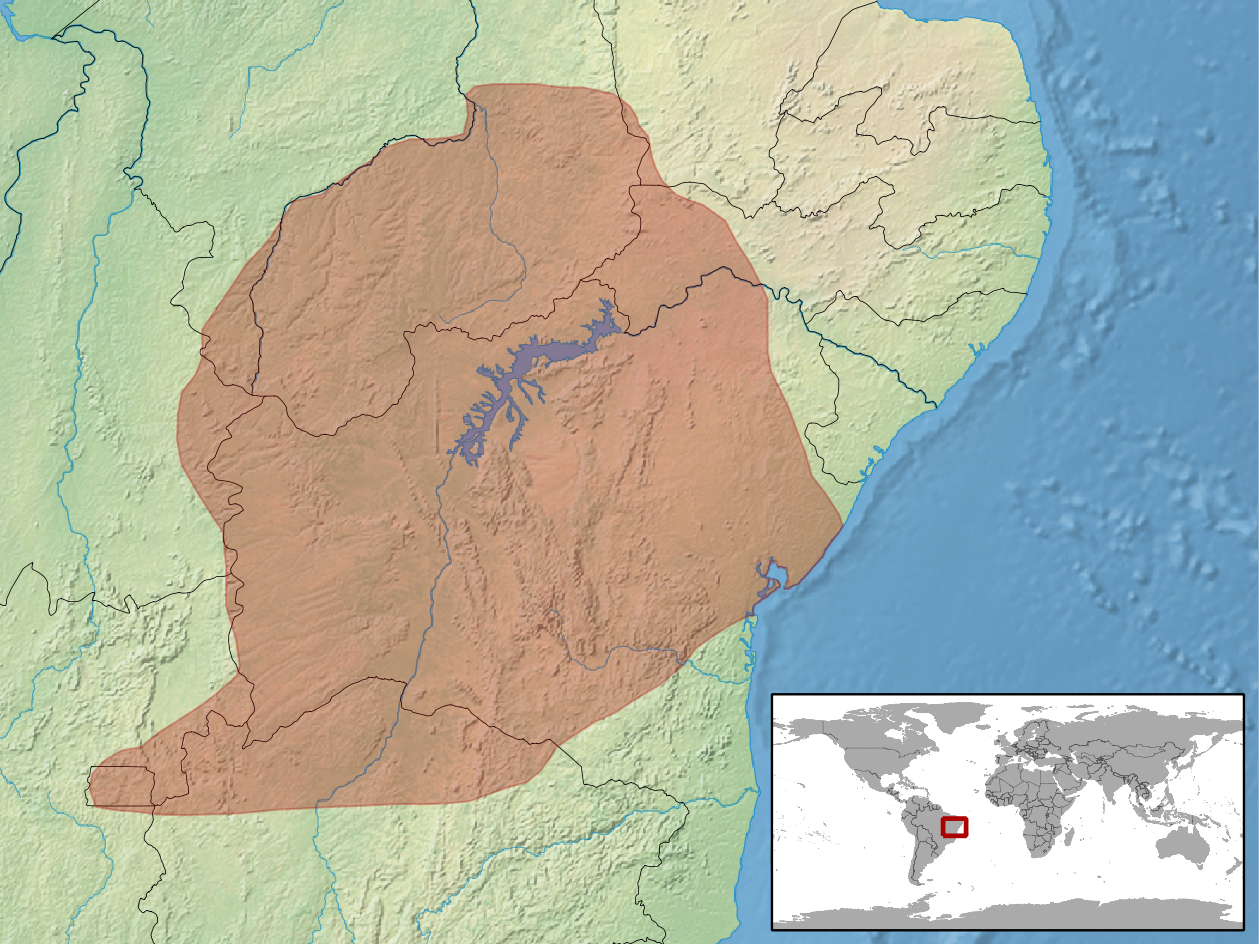

Synonyms
- Lachesis lutzi Miranda-Ribeiro; Bothrops iglesiasi Amaral, 1923; Bothrops neuwiedi bahiensis Amaral, 1925; Bothrops neuwiedi piauhyensis Amaral, 1925; Bothrops neuwiedi lutzi — Amaral, 1929; Bothrops lutzi — Silva in Campbell & Lamar, 2004; Bothropoides lutzi — Fenwick et al., 2009; Bothrops lutzi — Carrasco et al., 2012

Species of snake

Bothrops lutzi, also known commonly as the Cerrado lancehead, is a species of venomous snake in the family Viperidae. The species is native to central eastern Brazil.

== Geographic range ==
Bothrop lutzi can be found in the Brazilian states of Bahia, Ceará, Goiás, Minas Gerais, Piauí, and Tocantins.

== Habitat ==
The preferred natural habitat of Bothrops lutzi is savanna, at altitudes from sea level to 800 m (2,600 ft).

== Venom ==
Bothrops lutzi has sparked an interest from the scientific community due to its venom, as it is believed to have some therapeutic potential. Scientists have found that the venom carried by B. lutzi has antibacterial and antiparasitic effects, which can help fight against microbial resistance by medical patients, as well as parasitic diseases like Leishmaniasis and Chagas disease.

== Reproduction ==
Bothrops lutzi is ovoviviparous.

== Etymology ==
The specific name, lutzi, is in honor of Adolfo Lutz of the Instituto Oswaldo Cruz, who collected the type specimen, upon which Miranda-Ribeiro based his new species description. Adolfo Lutz was the father of Brazilian herpetologist Bertha Lutz.
