= Stenotabanus pseudotaeniotes =

Scientific classification
- Kingdom: Animalia
- Phylum: Arthropoda
- Class: Insecta
- Order: Diptera
- Family: Tabanidae
- Subfamily: Tabaninae
- Tribe: Diachlorini
- Genus: Stenotabanus
- Species: S. pseudotaeniotes

Binomial name
- Stenotabanus pseudotaeniotes Kröber, 1929

Species of fly

Stenotabanus pseudotaeniotes is a species of horse flies in the family Tabanidae.

== Distribution ==
Brazil.
