= List of botanical gardens in Brazil =

Botanical gardens in Brazil have collections consisting entirely of Brazil native and endemic species; most have a collection that include plants from around the world. There are botanical gardens and arboreta in all states and territories of Brazil, most are administered by local governments, some are privately owned.

- Instituto Plantarum – São Paulo
- Fundação Zoobotânica – Porto Alegre
- Fundação Zoo-Botânica de Belo Horizonte (Zoo-botanical foundation of Belo Horizonte) – Belo Horizonte
- Jardim Botânico de Curitiba – Curitiba
- Jardim Botânico de São Paulo – São Paulo
- Jardim Botânico do Rio de Janeiro – Rio de Janeiro
- Núcleo de Pesquisa e Desenvolvimento Jardim Botânico – Campinas
- Jardim Botânico de Brasilia – Brasília
