= Stibasoma theotaenia =

Scientific classification
- Kingdom: Animalia
- Phylum: Arthropoda
- Class: Insecta
- Order: Diptera
- Family: Tabanidae
- Subfamily: Tabaninae
- Tribe: Diachlorini
- Genus: Stibasoma
- Species: S. theotaenia

Binomial name
- Stibasoma theotaenia (Wiedemann, 1828)

Synonyms
- Tabanus theotaenia Wiedemann, 1828

Species of fly

Stibasoma theotaenia is a species of horse flies in the family Tabanidae.

== Distribution ==
Brazil, Uruguay, Paraguay, Argentina.
