= Fidena leucopogon =

Scientific classification
- Kingdom: Animalia
- Phylum: Arthropoda
- Class: Insecta
- Order: Diptera
- Family: Tabanidae
- Subfamily: Pangoniinae
- Tribe: Scionini
- Genus: Fidena
- Species: F. leucopogon

Binomial name
- Fidena leucopogon (Wiedemann, 1828)

Synonyms
- Pangonia leucopogon Wiedemann, 1828; Pangonia basalis Walker, 1848; Phaeoneura basilaris var. acutipalpis Kröber, 1931

Species of fly

Fidena leucopogon is a species of fly in the family Tabanidae.

== Distribution ==
They are found in Brazil.
