= Botanical Garden of São Paulo =

Botanical garden in São Paulo, Brazil

- Jardim Botânico de São Paulo
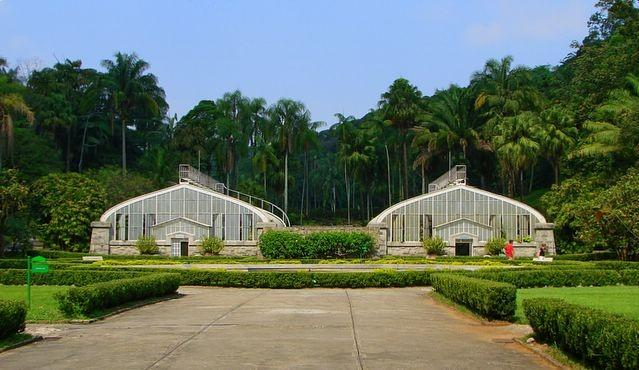
- Greenhouses at the Botanical Garden

- Location within São Paulo Location within Brazil
- Type: Botanical garden
- Location: São Paulo, São Paulo, Brazil
- Coordinates: 23°38′20″S 46°37′13″W
- Area: 164.45 hectares (406.4 acres)
- Created: 1938
- Operator: São Paulo (state)
- Open: Open year round
- Website: jardimbotanico.com.br

The Botanical Garden of São Paulo (Portuguese: Jardim Botânico de São Paulo) is a botanical garden in São Paulo, Brazil. The park spans a 164.45-hectare (406.4-acre) area in the Fontes do Ipiranga State Park, at the district of Água Funda, in São Paulo's South zone, next to São Paulo Zoo. It houses the state's Botanical Institute (Instituto de Botânica). It was founded, in its current location, in 1928, by the botanist Frederico Carlos Hoehne.

== History ==
Since 1893, the São Paulo state government began expropriations in order to preserve the sources of the Ipiranga River and the surrounding Atlantic Forest area. The year 1917 marks the founding of the State Park (Parque do Estado); sources were used until 1928 to supply water to the district of Ipiranga. The state park changed its name in 1969 and became the Parque Estadual Fontes do Ipiranga.

The botanical garden has the following plant varieties: orchids, ornamental plants, aquatic plants, mushrooms, palm trees, fruit trees, trees providing timber, plants of the family Gesneriaceae, Marantaceae and pteridophytes.

It counts among its facilities: the Botanical Museum Dr. João Barbosa Rodrigues, the Jardim de Lineu (Garden of Linnaeus) and the mirror of water, greenhouses and the Dr. Frederico Carlos Hoehne orchidarium, Lago das Ninfeias (Lake of the Waterlilies), trails and sculptures.

== See also ==
- List of botanical gardens in Brazil
