= Stenotabanus psammophilus =

Scientific classification
- Kingdom: Animalia
- Phylum: Arthropoda
- Class: Insecta
- Order: Diptera
- Family: Tabanidae
- Subfamily: Tabaninae
- Tribe: Diachlorini
- Genus: Stenotabanus
- Species: S. psammophilus

Binomial name
- Stenotabanus psammophilus (Osten Sacken, 1876)

Synonyms
- Tabanus psammophilus Osten Sacken, 1876

Species of fly

Stenotabanus psammophilus is a species of horse flies in the family Tabanidae.

== Distribution ==
United States.
