= Ponte Orca =

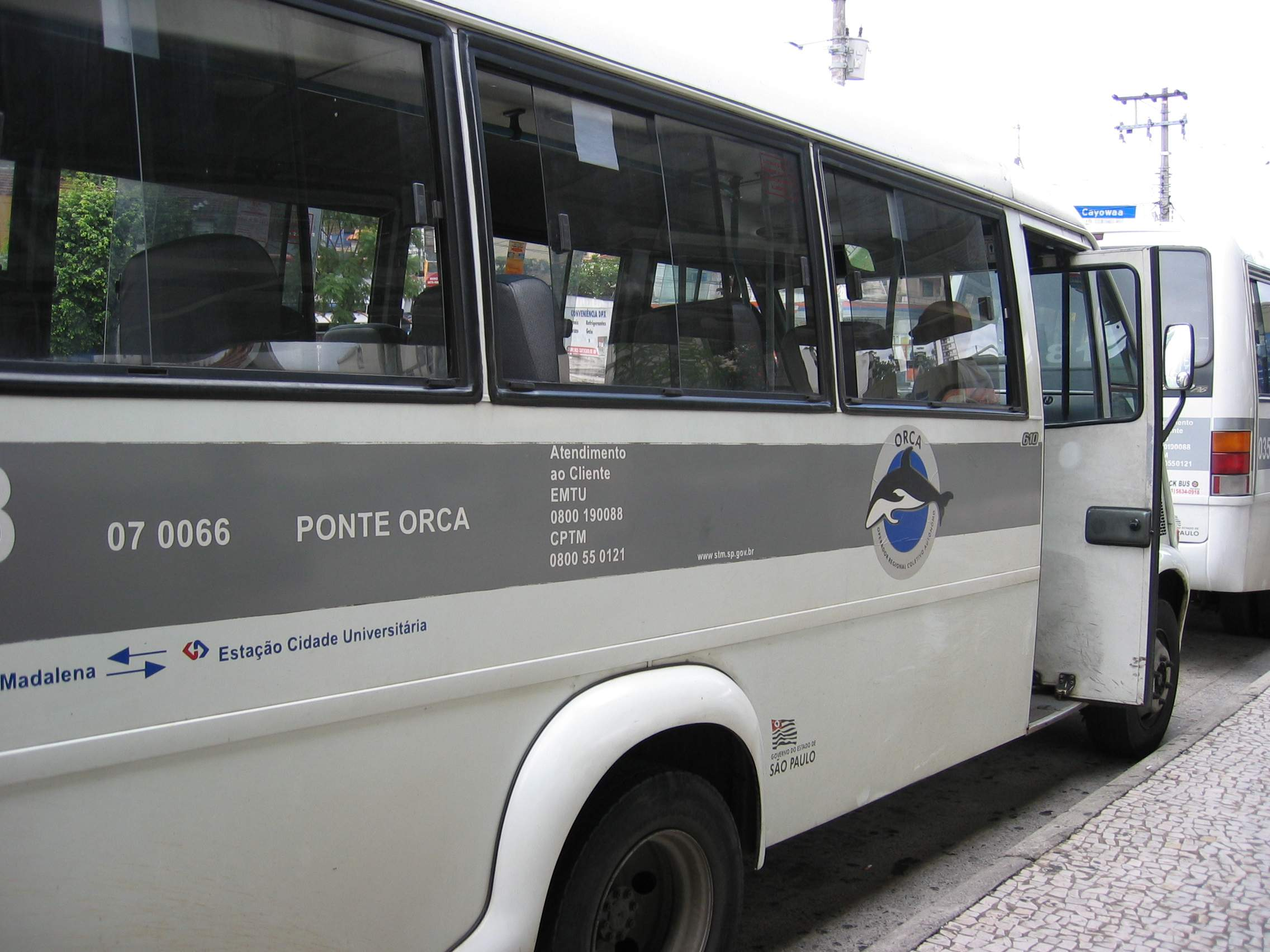
Ponte Orca CPTM-Metro terminal

Ponte Orca was a complementary service of the São Paulo Metro, managed by Empresa Metropolitana de Transportes Urbanos de São Paulo (EMTU), allowing free integration between Line 2-Green of the São Paulo Metro and Line 9-Emerald of CPTM.
