= Instituto Adolfo Lutz =

National laboratory of public health in São Paulo, Brazil

Instituto Adolfo Lutz is an analytical laboratory accredited as a National Laboratory of Public Health and Reference Laboratory Macroregional by the Brazilian Ministry of Health. It is based in São Paulo. It is the result of the combination of the Bacteriological Institute and the Dietetic Laboratories, participants in the Paulista Network of Health on October 26, 1940. The name of the new institute was a posthumous tribute to Adolfo Lutz, the first director of the Bacteriological Institute in 1892.

The Institute works in the areas of Bromatology and Chemistry, Biology, Medicine and Pathology, and produces knowledge relevant to public health, developing applied research, promoting and disseminating scientific research, collaborating in the development of technical standards, standardizing diagnostic methods and analytical methods, and organizing courses in technical training, improvement, and specialization.

== Bibliography ==
- Instituto Adolfo Lutz. Home. Access on July 29, 2010.
- CEP (2010). Anexo:1892 in História, Vol 1, 2.ª edição. São Paulo: editora Instituto.
