= Stenotabanus =

Scientific classification
- Kingdom: Animalia
- Phylum: Arthropoda
- Class: Insecta
- Order: Diptera
- Family: Tabanidae
- Subfamily: Tabaninae
- Tribe: Diachlorini
- Genus: Stenotabanus; Lutz, 1913

Type species
- Tabanus taeniotes Wiedemann, 1828

Diversity
- at least 100 species

Synonyms
- Styposelaga Enderlein, 1922

Genus of flies

Stenotabanus is a genus of horse flies in the family Tabanidae. There are at least 100 described species in Stenotabanus.

== See also ==
- List of Stenotabanus species
