= Stenotabanus taeniotes =

Scientific classification
- Kingdom: Animalia
- Phylum: Arthropoda
- Class: Insecta
- Order: Diptera
- Family: Tabanidae
- Subfamily: Tabaninae
- Tribe: Diachlorini
- Genus: Stenotabanus
- Species: S. taeniotes

Binomial name
- Stenotabanus taeniotes (Wiedemann, 1828)

Synonyms
- Tabanus taeniotes Wiedemann, 1828; Tabanus trifascia Walker, 1850

Species of fly

Stenotabanus taeniotes is a species of horse flies in the family Tabanidae.

== Distribution ==
Brazil.
