= São Paulo Aquarium =

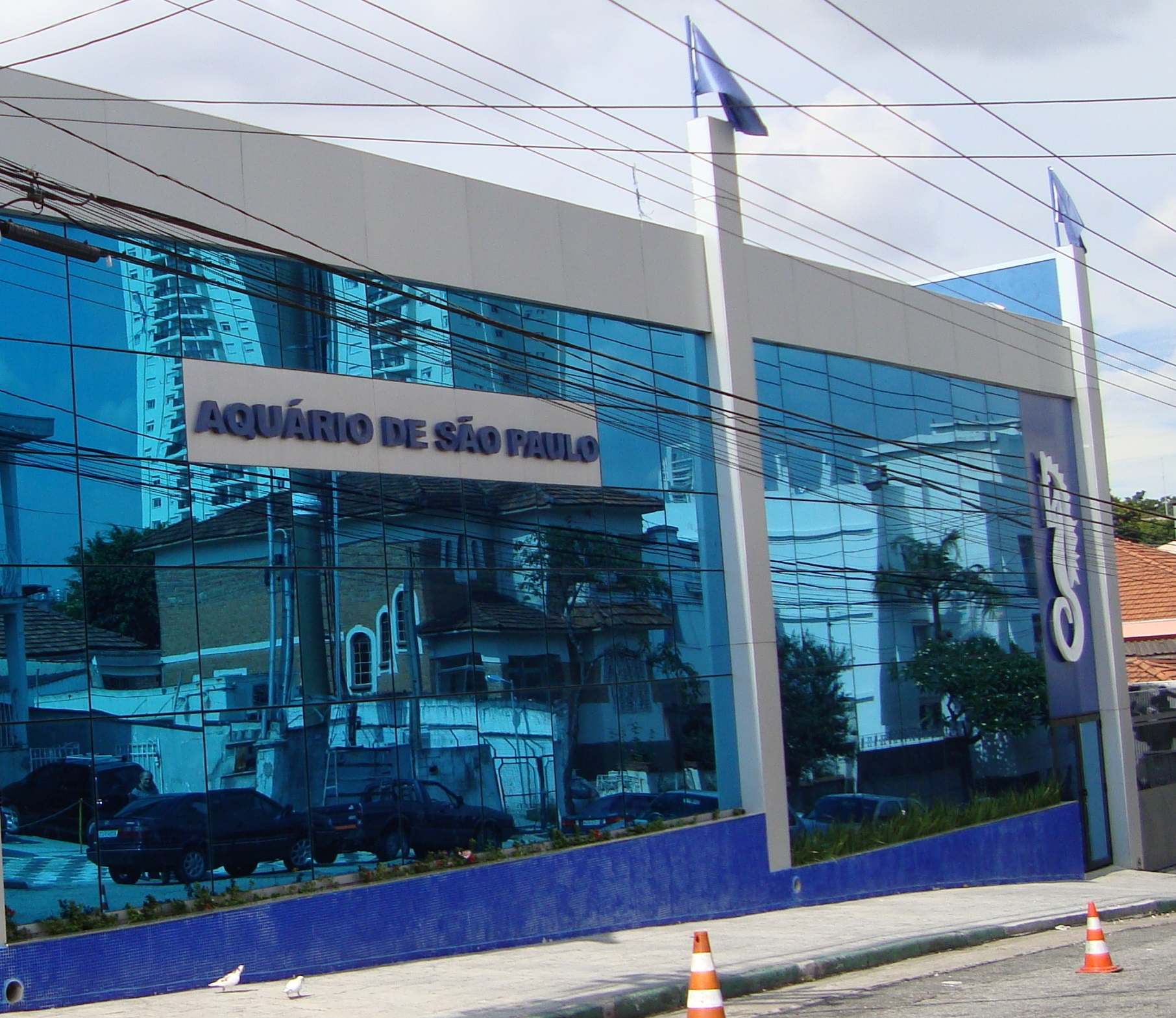
- Interactive map of São Paulo Aquarium
- 23°35′36″S 46°36′51″W
- Date opened: 6 July 2006
- Location: São Paulo, Brazil
- Land area: 15,000 square metres (160,000 sq ft)
- Total volume of tanks: 4×10^{6} L (880,000 imp gal; 1,100,000 U.S. gal)
- Website: www.aquariodesp.com.br

The Aquário de São Paulo (ASP), São Paulo Aquarium in English, is an oceanarium located in the district of Ipiranga, southeastern part of the city of São Paulo, Brazil. It was inaugurated on July 6, 2006, as the first thematic aquarium in Latin America.

Currently, the site has a total of 15,000 m^{2} and 4 million liters of water where thousands of animals of hundreds of species live and contributes to several conservation projects that deal with animals in a natural environment.

== Enclosures ==
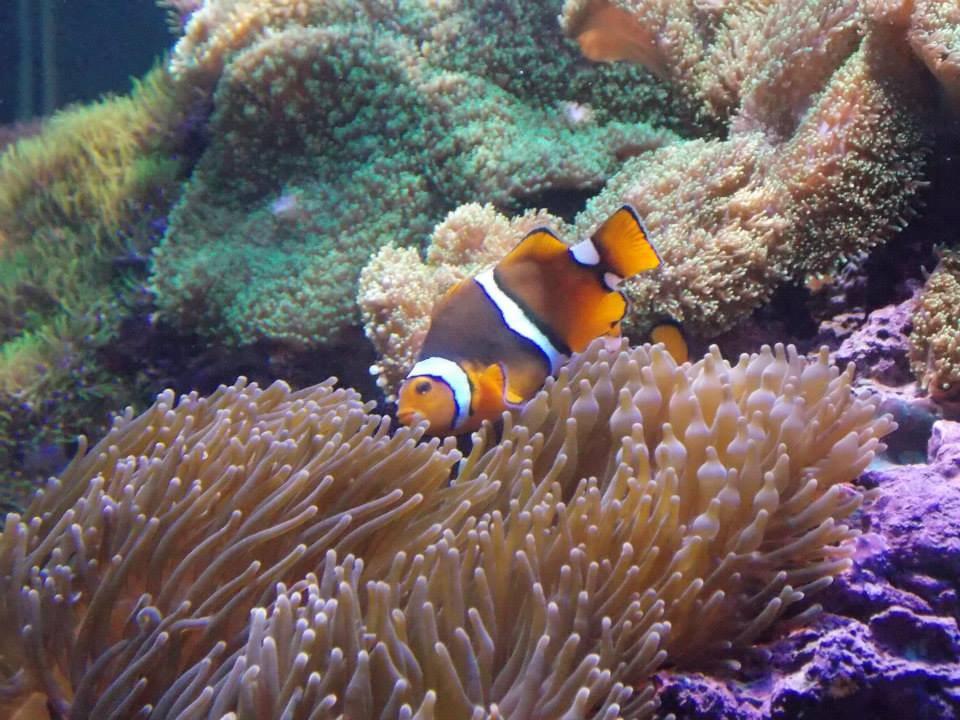
Clownfish on display at ASP.

The São Paulo Aquarium was inaugurated on July 6, 2006, when it had only one sector, with a total area of 3,000 m^{2}, where 25 tanks/aquariums were built that exhibited species of fish, reptiles and mammals that inhabit several ecosystems, such as the Amazon rainforest, the Pantanal and the Tietê River basin.

The first expansion occurred in 2008, with the construction of 2,000 m^{2} for the creation of the "Mundo Marinho" sector ("Marine World"), which had the increase of 11 tanks/enclosures where it began to demonstrate the gradual change between the freshwater and marine environment, with tanks representing brackish waters; mangroves; sandy beaches; rocky coast; ocean and reefs; containing several types of fish, sharks, rays and penguins.

In 2009, 10 new tanks/enclosures were built on 3,000 m^{2} to expand the "Amazônia" ("Amazon") sector, with the arrival of a manatee, giant anteaters, howler monkeys, otters and giant Amazonian fish (such as pirarucus, redtail catfish, tambaquis and jaús). In 2015, there was a major expansion with the creation of 13 new tanks in an area of 7,000 m^{2} focused on the animal world outside the country, such as meerkats, colobus and lemurs from the African continent; flying foxes and pythons from Indonesia; kangaroos, wombats, echidna and koalas from Australia; seals, sea lions, and polar bears.

Polar bears Aurora and Peregrino, born in Russia, are the first of their kind in the country. Despite the climate difference between their homeland and Brazil, these mammals, which together weigh 730 kg, had no problem adapting to their new home. They live in a 1,500-square-meter enclosure with a temperature between -15 °C and -5 °C.

In 2024, Nur, a polar bear cub, was born at the aquarium to Aurora and Peregrino. It was the first and, to date, the only animal of the species to be born in Latin America.

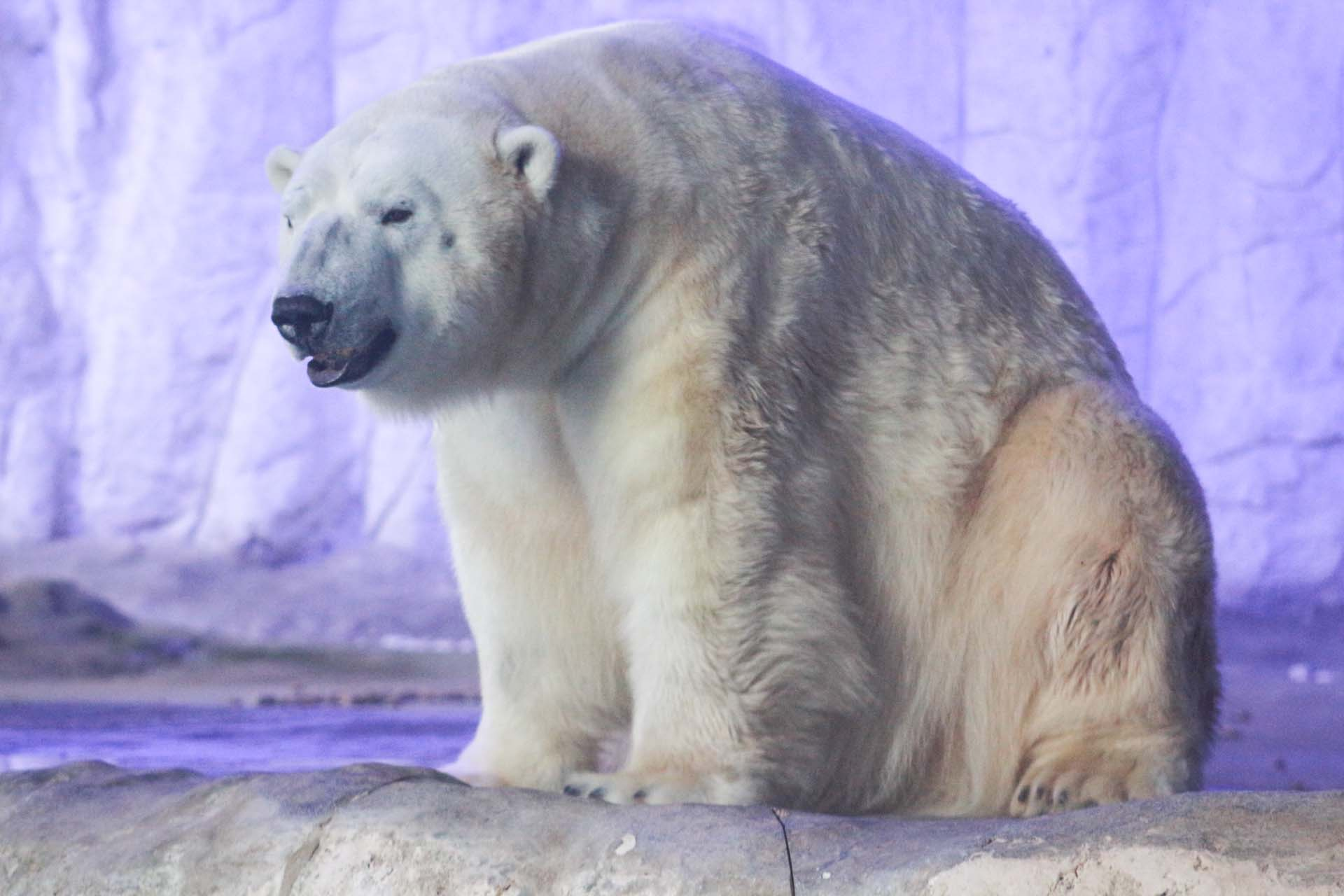
Polar bear at the São Paulo Aquarium.

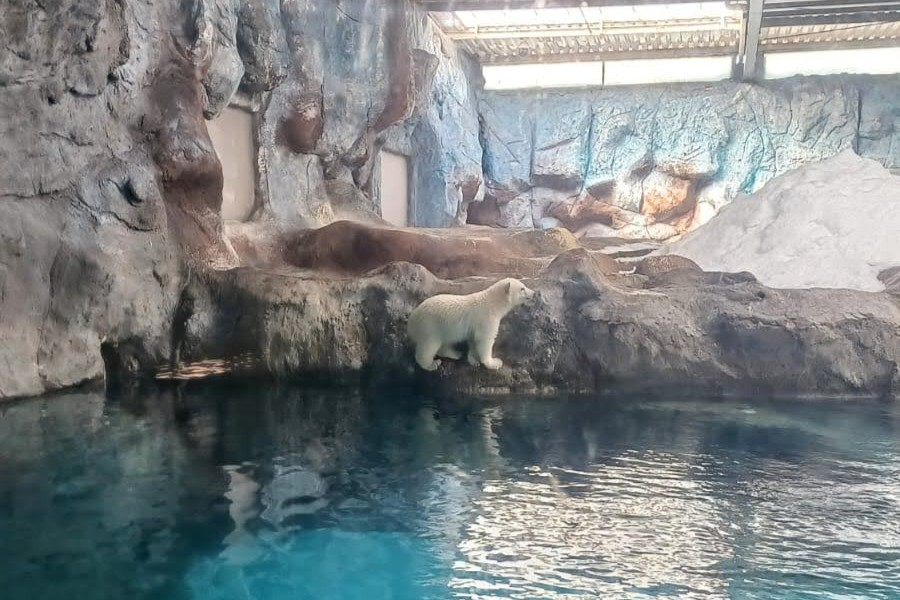
Nur, the first polar bear born in Latin America
