= Adolfo Lutz =

Brazilian physician and scientist (1855–1940)

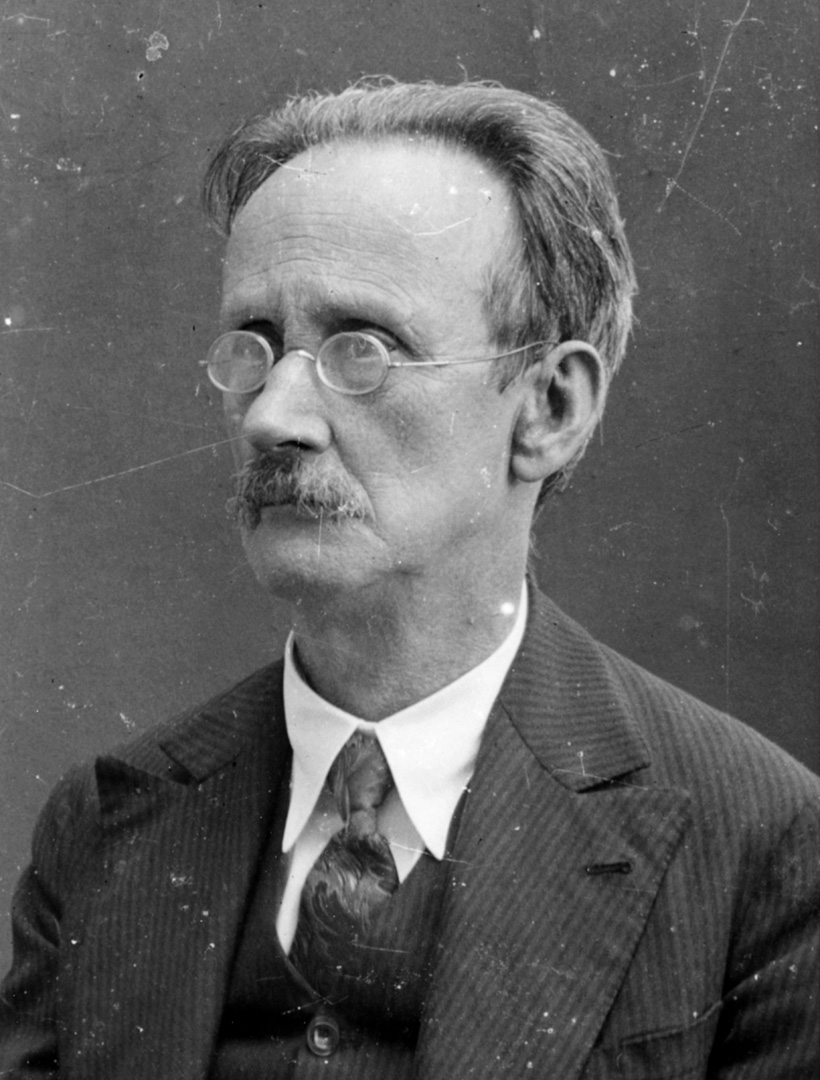
- Born: 18 December 1855; Rio de Janeiro, Empire of Brazil
- Died: October 6, 1940 (aged 84); Rio de Janeiro, Brazil
- Education: University of Bern
- Scientific career
- Fields: Physician
- Workplaces: Instituto Adolfo Lutz; Instituto Oswaldo Cruz

Adolfo Lutz (18 December 1855 – 6 October 1940) was a Brazilian physician, father of tropical medicine and medical zoology in Brazil, and a pioneer epidemiologist and researcher in infectious diseases.

== Life ==
Lutz was born in Rio de Janeiro, on December 18, 1855, son of Gustav Lutz († 1891) and Mathilde Oberteuffer, a family of Bern. He studied medicine in Switzerland, graduating in 1879 at the University of Bern. After graduation he went on to study experimental medicine techniques in London, England (where he studied with Joseph Lister, 1827–1912), Leipzig, Germany, Vienna, Austria, Prague and Paris, France (where he studied with Louis Pasteur, 1822–1895).

After his retirement in 1908, Dr. Adolfo Lutz moved to Rio de Janeiro, where he worked for 32 more years, until his death, on October 6, 1940, at the Instituto Oswaldo Cruz, created by another great Brazilian physician and epidemiologist, Oswaldo Cruz, and where he was a director of the Institute of Experimental Pathology.

His daughter, Bertha Lutz (1894–1976), was a Brazilian zoologist, feminist and politician.

== Work ==
Upon his return to Brazil in 1881, Lutz initially worked as a general clinician in the small city of Limeira, state of São Paulo for 6 years. Wishing to pursue medical research, he returned to Hamburg, Germany once again, to work with Paul Gerson Unna (1850–1929), specializing in infectious diseases and tropical medicine. As a result of his increasing fame, he was invited to the post of director of Kalihi Hospital, in Hawaii, where he carried out research on leprosy. Following this, he worked for a while in California, United States, before returning in 1892 to Brazil, attending an invitation from the government of the state of São Paulo to direct the Bacteriological Institute (later renamed in his honor to Instituto Adolfo Lutz, still in existence today in the city of São Paulo. The city of Santos was undergoing a severe epidemic of bubonic plague and Lutz went to work on it together with two other young physicians who would become luminaries of Brazilian medicine, Emílio Ribas and Vital Brazil. Vital Brazil and Lutz became friends, and Lutz supported Vital Brazil's pioneering research on antivenoms for snake bites, contributing decisively for the creation of another institution in São Paulo, exclusively devoted to ophidian research, the Instituto Butantan. This serology institute hosted a plant for producing vaccines and antisera against several diseases, such as smallpox and plague.

Lutz was the first Latin American scientist to study in depth and to confirm the mechanisms of transmission of yellow fever by the Aedes aegypti species of mosquitoes, its natural reservoir and vector, as they had been discovered a few years before, by American physician Walter Reed. Lutz was also responsible for the identification of South American blastomycosis, which received his name (Lutz-Splendore-de-Almeida disease). His dedication to public health was also paramount to the research and fight of several epidemics in many points in Brazil, such as cholera, bubonic plague, smallpox, typhoid fever, malaria, ankylostomiasis, schistosomiasis and leishmaniasis; which were then widely prevalent as tropical diseases in the state, due to the poor conditions of poverty, hygiene and ignorance about its transmission mechanisms. To this purpose, Lutz travelled widely across Brazil, visiting often the country's hinterland along the São Francisco River.

Among his many accomplishments, Adolfo Lutz was also a pioneer researcher on medical entomology and the therapeutic properties of Brazilian plants (botany, ethnopharmacology and phytotherapy). As a zoologist, he described several new species of amphibians and insects such as Anopheles lutzii (an Anopheles mosquito).

Adolfo Lutz is honored in the scientific names of four species of Brazilian amphibians and reptiles: Adenomera lutzi, Paratelmatobius lutzii, and Thoropa lutzi frogs; and Bothrops lutzi, a venomous snake. For his work on tropical diseases, Lutz received a nomination for the Nobel Prize in Physiology or Medicine in 1938

== See also ==
- Lutz-Jeanselme syndrome
