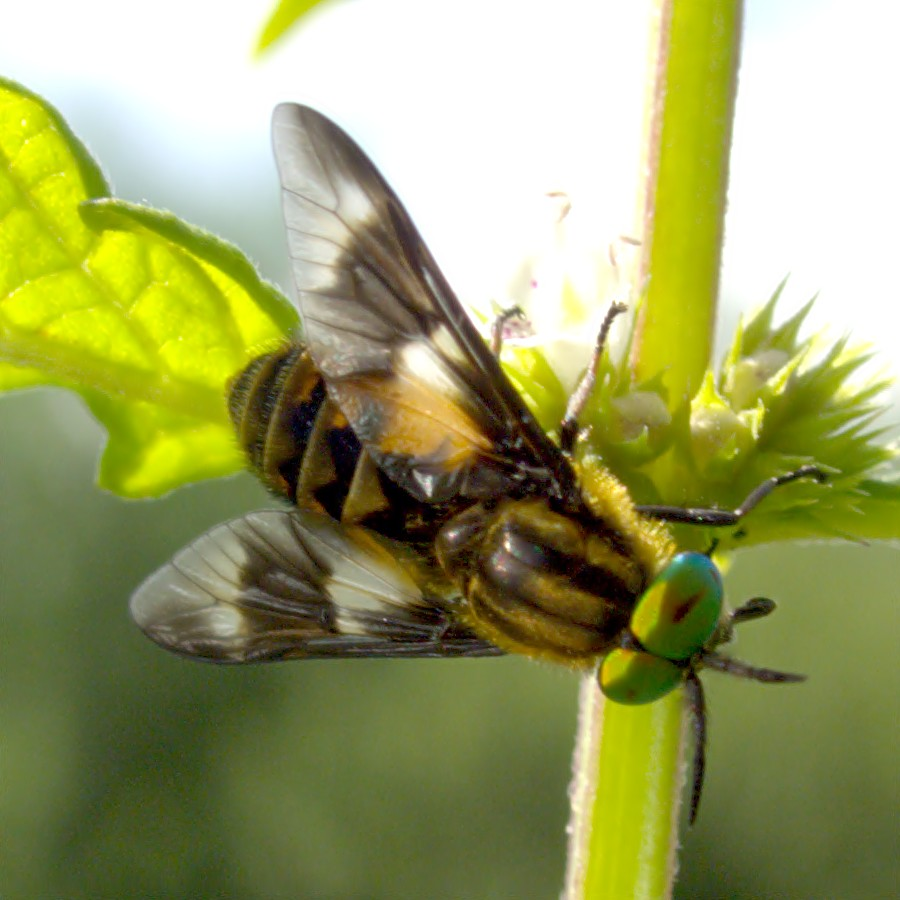

Scientific classification
- Kingdom: Animalia
- Phylum: Arthropoda
- Clade: Pancrustacea
- Class: Insecta
- Order: Diptera
- Infraorder: Tabanomorpha
- Superfamily: Tabanoidea

Families
- Athericidae; Oreoleptidae; Pelecorhynchidae; Tabanidae

= Tabanoidea =

Superfamily of flies

Superfamily Tabanoidea are insects in the order Diptera.

== Systematics ==
Tabanoidea

- Family Athericidae

- Sunfamily Dasyommatinae

- Genus Dasyomma Macquart, 1840

- Subfamily Athericinae

- Genus Asuragina Yang & Nagatomi, 1992
- Genus Atherix Meigen, 1803
- Genus Atrichops Verrall, 1909
- Genus Microphora Krober, 1840
- Genus Pachybates Bezzi, 1926
- Genus Suragina Walker, 1858
- Genus Suraginella Stuckenberg, 2000
- Genus Trichacantha Stuckenberg, 1955
- Genus Xeritha Stuckenberg, 1966
- Genus †Athericites Mostovski, Jarzembowski & Coram, 2003
- Genus †Succinatherix Stuckenberg, 1974 Baltic amber, Eocene

- Family Oreoleptidae

- Genus Oreoleptis Zloty, Sinclair, & Pritchard, 2005

- Family Pelecorhynchidae

- Genus Pelecorhynchus Macquart, 1850
- Genus Glutops Burgess, 1878
- Genus Pseudoerinna Shiraki, 1932

- Family Tabanidae

- Subfamily Adersiinae

- Genus Adersia Austen, 1912

- Subfamily Chrysopsinae

- Tribe Chrysopsini

- Genus Chrysops Meigen, 1803
- Genus Melissomorpha Ricardo, 1906
- Genus Nemorius Rondani, 1856
- Genus Neochrysops Walton, 1918
- Genus Picromyza Quentin, 1979 (Sometimes placed in Chrysops)
- Genus Silviomyza Philip & Mackerras, 1960
- Genus Silvius Meigen, 1820
- Genus Surcoufia Kröber, 1922

- Tribe Bouvieromyiini

- Genus Aegophagamyia Austen, 1912
- Genus Eucompsa Enderlein, 1922
- Genus Gressittia Philip & Mackerras, 1960
- Genus Merycomyia Hine, 1912
- Genus Paulianomyia Oldroyd, 1957
- Genus Phibalomyia Taylor, 1920
- Genus Pseudopangonia Ricardo, 1915
- Genus Pseudotabanus Ricardo, 1915
- Genus Rhigioglossa Wiedemann, 1828
- Genus Thaumastomyia Philip & Mackerras, 1960

- Tribe Rhinomyzini

- Genus Alocella Quentin, 1990
- Genus Betrequia Oldroyd, 1970
- Genus Gastroxides Saunders, 1842
- Genus Jashinea Oldroyd, 1970
- Genus Mackerrasia Dias, 1956
- Genus Oldroydiella Dias, 1955
- Genus Orgizocella Quentin, 1990
- Genus Orgizomyia Grünberg, 1906
- Genus Rhinomyza Wiedemann, 1820
- Genus Seguytabanus Paulian, 1962
- Genus Sphecodemyia Austen, 1937
- Genus Tabanocella Bigot, 1856
- Genus Thaumastocera Grünberg, 1906
- Genus Thriambeutes Grünberg, 1906

- Subfamily Pangoniinae

- Tribe Pangoniini Lessard, 2014

- Genus Goniops Aldrich, 1892

- Tribe Mycteromyiini

- Genus Caenopangonia Kröber, 1930

- Tribe Pangoniini

- Genus Apatolestes Williston, 1885
- Genus Asaphomyia Stone, 1953
- Genus Austroplex Mackerras, 1955
- Genus Brennania Philip, 1941
- Genus Caenoprosopon Ricardo, 1915
- Genus Ectenopsis Macquart, 1838
- Genus Esenbeckia Rondani, 1863
- Genus Nagatomyia Murdoch & Takashasi, 1961
- Genus Pangonius Latreille, 1802
- Genus Pegasomyia Burger, 1985
- Genus Protosilvius Enderlein, 1922
- Genus Stonemyia Brennan, 1935
- Genus Therevopangonia Mackerras, 1955

- Tribe Philolichini

- Genus Philoliche Wiedemann, 1920

- Tribe Scionini

- Genus Anzomyia Lessard, 2012
- Genus Aotearomyia Lessard, 2014
- Genus Apocampta Schiner, 1868
- Genus Copidapha Enderlein, 1922
- Genus Fidena Walker, 1850
- Genus Lepmia Fairchild, 1969
- Genus Myioscaptia Mackerras, 1955
- Genus Osca Walker, 1850
- Genus Palimmecomyia Taylor, 1917
- Genus Parosca Enderlein, 1922
- Genus Pityocera Giglio-Tos, 1896
- Genus Plinthina Walker, 1850
- Genus Pseudomelpia Enderlein, 1922
- Genus Pseudoscione Lutz, 1918
- Genus Scaptia Walker, 1850

- Subgenus Plinthina Walker, 1850

- Genus Scione Walker, 1850
- Genus Triclista Enderlein, 1922

- Tribe Scepsidini

- Genus Scepsis Walker, 1850

- Incertae sedis within Pangoniinae

- Genus Zophina Philip, 1954

- Subfamily Tabaninae

- Tribe Diachlorini

- Genus Acanthocera Macquart, 1834
- Genus Acellomyia Gonzalez, 1999
- Genus Anacimas Enderlein, 1923
- Genus Anaerythrops Barretto, 1948
- Genus Atelozella Bequaert, 1930
- Genus Atelozomyia Dias, 1987
- Genus Bartolomeudiasiella Dias, 1987
- Genus Bolbodimyia Bigot, 1892
- Genus Buestanmyia González, 2021
- Genus Catachlorops Lutz, 1909
- Genus Chalybosoma Oldroyd, 1949
- Genus Chasmia Enderlein, 1922
- Genus Chlorotabanus Lutz, 1909
- Genus Cretotabanus Fairchild, 1969
- Genus Cryptotylus Lutz, 1909
- Genus Cydistomorpha Trojan, 1994
- Genus Cydistomyia Taylor, 1919
- Genus Dasybasis Macquart, 1847
- Genus Dasychela Enderlein, 1922
- Genus Dasyrhamphis Enderlein, 1922
- Genus Diachlorus Osten Sacken, 1876
- Genus Dichelacera Macquart, 1838
- Genus Dicladocera Lutz, 1913
- Genus Elephantotus Gorayeb, 2014
- Genus Erioneura Barretto, 1951
- Genus Eristalotabanus Kröber, 1931
- Genus Eutabanus Kröber, 1930
- Genus Hemichrysops Kröber, 1930
- Genus Himantostylus Lutz, 1913
- Genus Holcopsis Enderlein, 1923
- Genus Japenoides Oldroyd, 1949
- Genus Lepiselaga Macquart, 1938
- Genus Leptapha Enderlein, 1923
- Genus Leucotabanus Lutz, 1913
- Genus Limata Oldroyd, 1954
- Genus Lissimas Enderlein, 1922
- Genus Microtabanus Fairchild, 1937
- Genus Montismyia González, 2017
- Genus Myiotabanus Lutz, 1928
- Genus Nanorrhynchus Olsoufiev, 1937
- Genus Neavella Oldroyd, 1954
- Genus Neobolbodimyia Ricardo, 1913
- Genus Oopelma Enderlein, 1923
- Genus Pachyschelomyia Barretto, 1951
- Genus Phaeotabanus Lutz, 1913
- Genus Philipomyia Olsufjev, 1964
- Genus Philipota Kapoor, 1991
- Genus Philipotabanus Fairchild, 1943
- Genus Pseudacanthocera Lutz, 1913
- Genus Rhabdotylus Lutz, 1909
- Genus Roquezia Wilkerson, 1985
- Genus Selasoma Macquart, 1838
- Genus Spilotabanus Fairchild, 1969
- Genus Stenotabanus Lutz, 1913
- Genus Stibasoma Schiner, 1867
- Genus Stonemyia Burger, 1985
- Genus Stypommisa Enderlein, 1923
- Genus Teskeyellus Philip & Fairchild, 1974

- Tribe Haematopotini

- Genus Haematopota Meigen, 1803
- Genus Heptatoma Meigen, 1803
- Genus Hippocentrodes Philip, 1961
- Genus Hippocentrum Austen, 1908

- Tribe Tabanini

- Genus Agkistrocerus Philip, 1941
- Genus Ancala Enderlein, 1922
- Genus Atylotus Osten Sacken, 1876
- Genus Dasyrhamphis Enderlein, 1922
- Genus Hamatabanus Philip, 1941
- Genus Hybomitra Enderlein, 1922
- Genus Poeciloderas Lutz, 1921
- Genus Tabanus Linnaeus, 1758
- Genus Therioplectes Zeller, 1842
- Genus Whitneyomyia Bequaert, 1933
