= Tabanus dorsifer =

Scientific classification
- Kingdom: Animalia
- Phylum: Arthropoda
- Clade: Pancrustacea
- Class: Insecta
- Order: Diptera
- Family: Tabanidae
- Subfamily: Tabaninae
- Tribe: Tabanini
- Genus: Tabanus
- Species: T. dorsifer

Binomial name
- Tabanus dorsifer Walker, 1860

Synonyms
- Tabanus hyalinipennis Hine, 1903; Tabanus intensivus Townsend, 1897; Tabanus monilus Philip, 1968; Tabanus colimaensis Kröber, 1931

Species of fly

Tabanus dorsifer is a species of horse fly in the family Tabanidae.

== Distribution ==
Mexico, United States.
