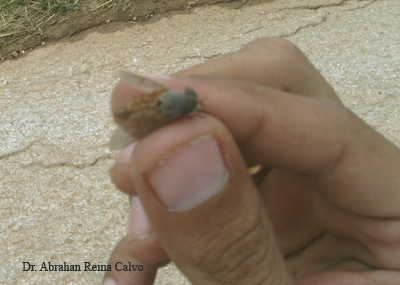
- Tabanus subsimilis

Scientific classification
- Kingdom: Animalia
- Phylum: Arthropoda
- Clade: Pancrustacea
- Class: Insecta
- Order: Diptera
- Family: Tabanidae
- Subfamily: Tabaninae
- Tribe: Tabanini
- Genus: Tabanus
- Species: T. subsimilis

Binomial name
- Tabanus subsimilis Bellardi, 1859

Synonyms
- Tabanus despectus Fairchild, 1942; Tabanus vittiger ssp. nippontucki Philip, 1942; Tabanus vittiger ssp. schwardti Philip, 1942

= Tabanus subsimilis =

Species of fly

Tabanus subsimilis is a species of horse fly in the family Tabanidae.

== Distribution ==
United States, Mexico.
