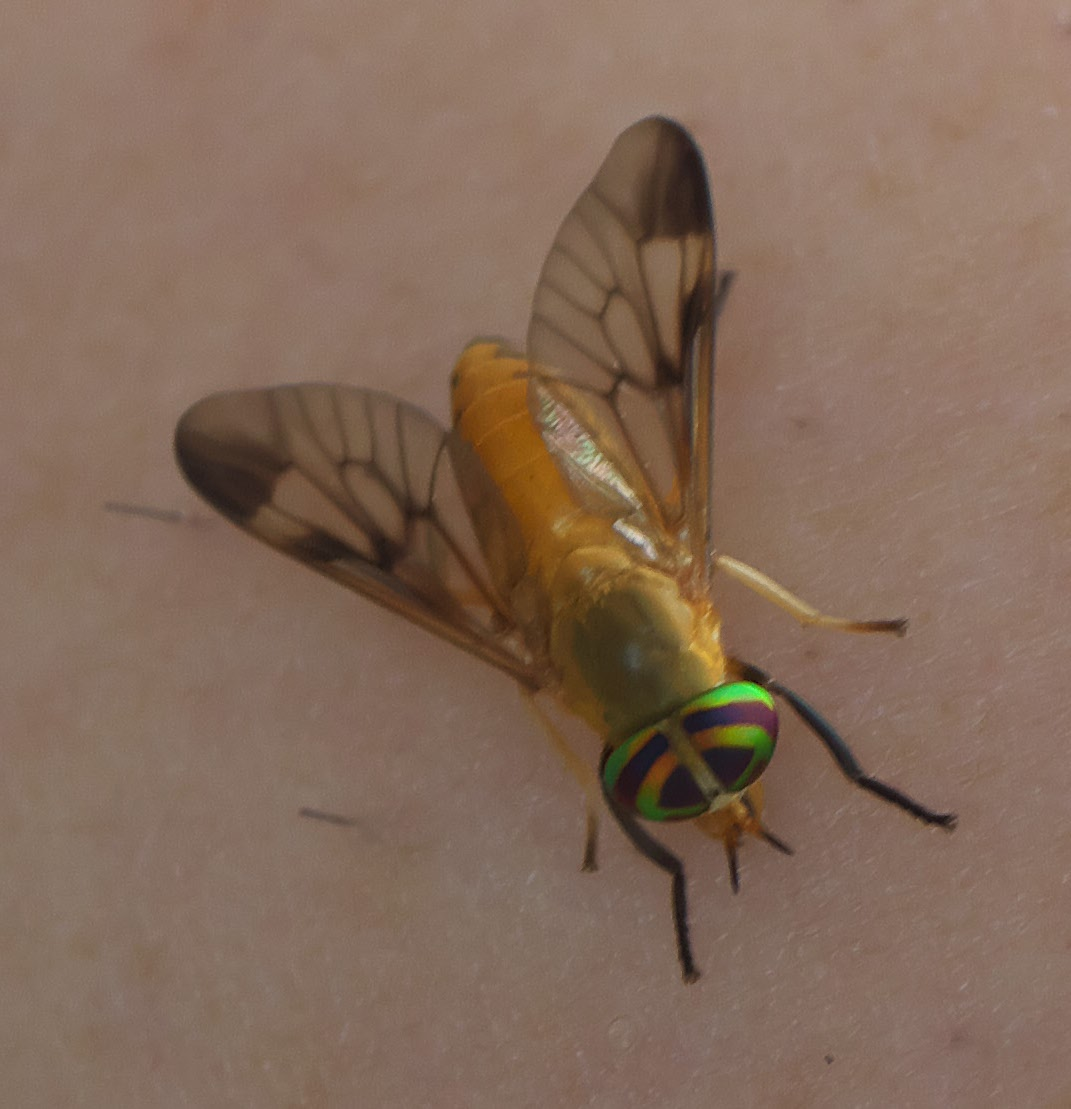
- Diachlorus ferrugatus, Okefenokee Swamp, Georgia

Scientific classification
- Kingdom: Animalia
- Phylum: Arthropoda
- Class: Insecta
- Order: Diptera
- Family: Tabanidae
- Subfamily: Tabaninae
- Tribe: Diachlorini (Loew, 1860)

= Diachlorini =

Tribe of flies

Diachlorini is a tribe of horse flies in the family Tabanidae.

== Genera ==
- Acanthocera Macquart, 1834
- Acellomyia Gonzalez, 1999
- Anacimas Enderlein, 1923
- Anaerythrops Barretto, 1948
- Atelozella Bequaert, 1930
- Atelozomyia Dias, 1987
- Bartolomeudiasiella Dias, 1987
- Bolbodimyia Bigot, 1892
- Buestanmyia González, 2021
- Catachlorops Lutz, 1909
- Chalybosoma Oldroyd, 1949
- Chasmia Enderlein, 1922
- Chlorotabanus Lutz, 1909
- Cretotabanus Fairchild, 1969
- Cryptotylus Lutz, 1909
- Cydistomorpha Trojan, 1994
- Cydistomyia Taylor, 1919
- Dasybasis Macquart, 1847
- Dasychela Enderlein, 1922
- Dasyrhamphis Enderlein, 1922
- Diachlorus Osten Sacken, 1876
- Dichelacera Macquart, 1838
- Dicladocera Lutz, 1913
- Elephantotus Gorayeb, 2014
- Erioneura Barretto, 1951
- Eristalotabanus Kröber, 1931
- Eutabanus Kröber, 1930
- Hemichrysops Kröber, 1930
- Himantostylus Lutz, 1913
- Holcopsis Enderlein, 1923
- Japenoides Oldroyd, 1949
- Lepiselaga Macquart, 1938
- Leptapha Enderlein, 1923
- Leucotabanus Lutz, 1913
- Limata Oldroyd, 1954
- Lissimas Enderlein, 1922
- Microtabanus Fairchild, 1937
- Montismyia González, 2017
- Myiotabanus Lutz, 1928
- Nanorrhynchus Olsoufiev, 1937
- Neavella Oldroyd, 1954
- Neobolbodimyia Ricardo, 1913
- Oopelma Enderlein, 1923
- Pachyschelomyia Barretto, 1951
- Phaeotabanus Lutz, 1913
- Philipomyia Olsufjev, 1964
- Philipota Kapoor, 1991
- Philipotabanus Fairchild, 1943
- Pseudacanthocera Lutz, 1913
- Rhabdotylus Lutz, 1909
- Roquezia Wilkerson, 1985
- Selasoma Macquart, 1838
- Spilotabanus Fairchild, 1969
- Stenotabanus Lutz, 1913
- Stibasoma Schiner, 1867
- Stonemyia Burger, 1985
- Stypommisa Enderlein, 1923
- Teskeyellus Philip & Fairchild, 1974
