= Rhigioglossa =

Scientific classification
- Kingdom: Animalia
- Phylum: Arthropoda
- Class: Insecta
- Order: Diptera
- Family: Tabanidae
- Subfamily: Chrysopsinae
- Tribe: Bouvieromyiini
- Genus: Rhigioglossa; Wiedemann, 1828

Type species
- Rhinomyza edentula Wiedemann, 1828

Synonyms
- Erodiorhynchus Macquart, 1838; Herodiorhynchus Agassiz, 1846; Mesomyia Macquart, 1850; Scarphia Walker, 1850; Metoponaplos Ricardo, 1915

Genus of flies

Rhigioglossa is a genus of horse flies in the family Tabanidae.

== Species ==
- Rhigioglossa algoensis (Oldroyd, 1957)
- Rhigioglossa andrewesi Chainey, 1987
- Rhigioglossa anomala (Oldroyd, 1957)
- Rhigioglossa apiformis (Neave, 1915)
- Rhigioglossa araucana (Coscarón, 1972)
- Rhigioglossa argentea (Oldroyd, 1957)
- Rhigioglossa atrata (Schuurmans Stekhoven, 1926)
- Rhigioglossa aurantiaca (Oldroyd, 1957)
- Rhigioglossa barbata (Bigot, 1892)
- Rhigioglossa barnardi (Oldroyd, 1957)
- Rhigioglossa callosa (Ricardo, 1920)
- Rhigioglossa capensis Chainey, 1987
- Rhigioglossa confluens (Loew, 1858)
- Rhigioglossa constrictifrons (Oldroyd, 1957)
- Rhigioglossa contraria (Austen, 1937)
- Rhigioglossa coriaria (Oldroyd, 1957)
- Rhigioglossa costata (Loew, 1860)
- Rhigioglossa cuneata (Loew, 1858)
- Rhigioglossa cuprea (Trojan, 2002)
- Rhigioglossa cydistra (Taylor, 1918)
- Rhigioglossa decora (Macquart, 1850)
- Rhigioglossa demeijerei (Ricardo, 1913)
- Rhigioglossa designata (Oldroyd, 1957)
- Rhigioglossa dimidiata (Wulp, 1869)
- Rhigioglossa divergens (Oldroyd, 1957)
- Rhigioglossa doddi (Ricardo, 1915)
- Rhigioglossa edentula (Wiedemann, 1828)
- Rhigioglossa fallax (Austen, 1912)
- Rhigioglossa femoralis (Ricardo, 1913)
- Rhigioglossa flavibasalis Chainey, 1987
- Rhigioglossa flavipes (Hine, 1923)
- Rhigioglossa fuliginosa (Taylor, 1916)
- Rhigioglossa hirsuta (Ricardo, 1920)
- Rhigioglossa hoffeinsorum (Trojan, 2002)
- Rhigioglossa imitator (Ferguson, 1921)
- Rhigioglossa ismayi (Chainey, 1989)
- Rhigioglossa kiboriani (Lamerton, 1964)
- Rhigioglossa latifrons (Mackerras, 1961)
- Rhigioglossa lineacallosa Chainey, 1987
- Rhigioglossa longipennis (Séguy, 1950)
- Rhigioglossa lurida (Walker, 1848)
- Rhigioglossa mansoni (Summers, 1912)
- Rhigioglossa marieps (Usher, 1965)
- Rhigioglossa milleri Chainey, 1987
- Rhigioglossa montana (Ricardo, 1917)
- Rhigioglossa monticola (Neave, 1915)
- Rhigioglossa montonenae Taylor & Chainey, 1994
- Rhigioglossa mossambicensis (Dias, 1955)
- Rhigioglossa munroi Chainey, 1987
- Rhigioglossa namaquina (Oldroyd, 1957)
- Rhigioglossa namibiensis Chainey, 1987
- Rhigioglossa nigerrima (Mackerras, 1961)
- Rhigioglossa nigricans (Loew, 1858)
- Rhigioglossa nitens Chainey, 1987
- Rhigioglossa norrisi (Mackerras, 1961)
- Rhigioglossa nyassica (Enderlein, 1922)
- Rhigioglossa obutundata (Oldroyd, 1957)
- Rhigioglossa oritensis (Bigot, 1892)
- Rhigioglossa paralurida (Ferguson & Henry, 1920)
- Rhigioglossa provincialis (Oldroyd, 1957)
- Rhigioglossa pusilla (Schiner, 1868)
- Rhigioglossa redunda (Oldroyd, 1957)
- Rhigioglossa rubricornis (Kröber, 1930)
- Rhigioglossa seyrigi (Séguy, 1950)
- Rhigioglossa smaragdops Manning, 1991
- Rhigioglossa stannusi (Oldroyd, 1957)
- Rhigioglossa stigmatica (Trojan, 2002)
- Rhigioglossa stradbrokei (Taylor, 1917)
- Rhigioglossa sulcifrons (Ferguson, 1921)
- Rhigioglossa tepperi (Ferguson, 1921)
- Rhigioglossa tinleyi (Usher, 1965)
- Rhigioglossa turneri (Austen, 1937)
- Rhigioglossa vittata (Ricardo, 1913)
- Rhigioglossa yantarophila (Trojan, 2002)
