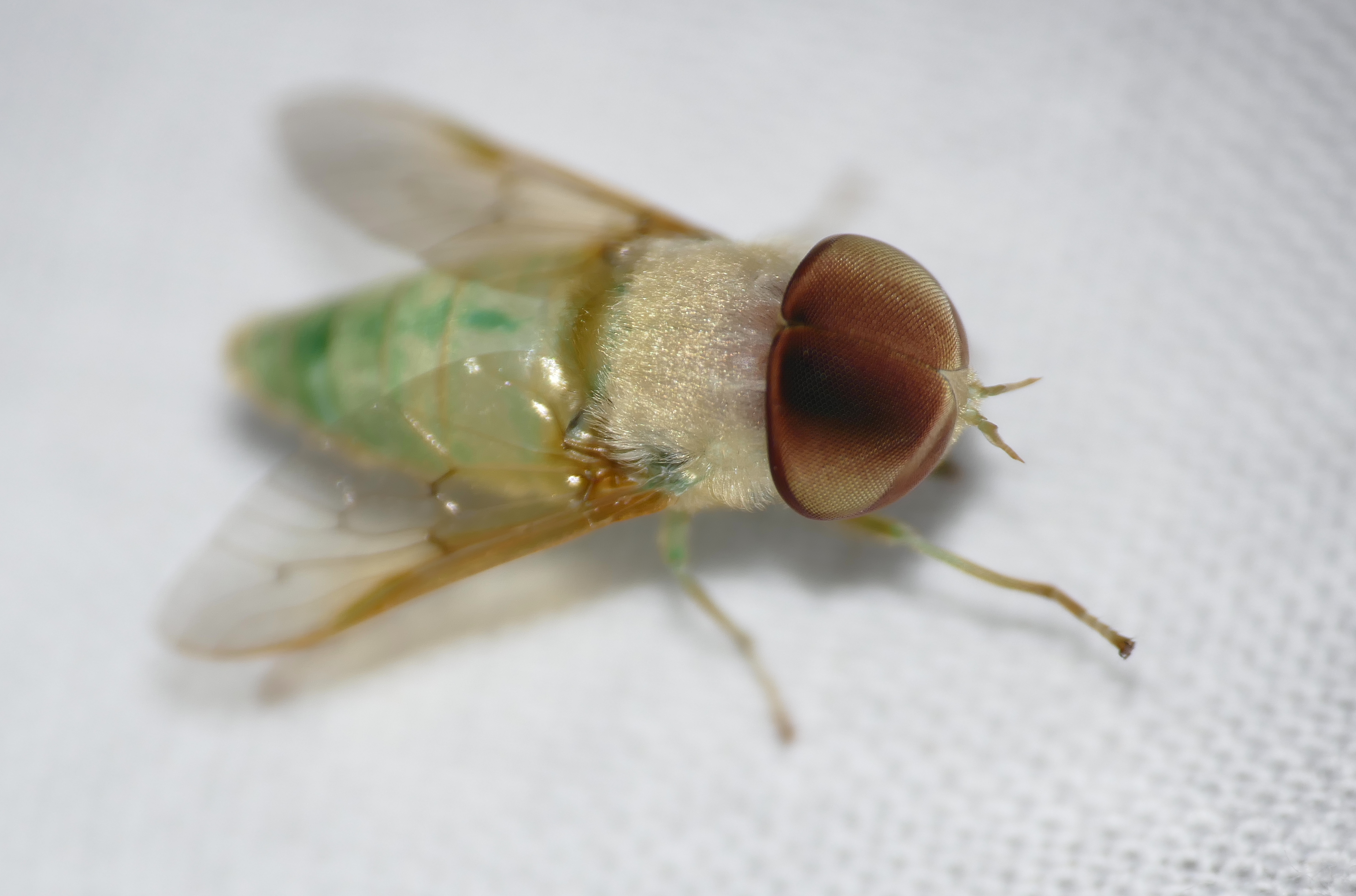
- Chlorotabanus inanis

Scientific classification
- Kingdom: Animalia
- Phylum: Arthropoda
- Clade: Pancrustacea
- Class: Insecta
- Order: Diptera
- Family: Tabanidae
- Subfamily: Tabaninae
- Tribe: Diachlorini
- Genus: Chlorotabanus; Lutz, 1909

Type species
- Tabanus mexicanus Linnaeus, 1758

= Chlorotabanus =

Genus of flies

Chlorotabanus is a genus of horse flies in the family Tabanidae. Though there were earlier descriptions of the genus, they did not fit the qualification of the Code of the International Zoological Nomenclature, thus the genus was officially accepted in 1913 by the scientific community.

== Behavior ==
All species under this genus are crepuscular and nocturnal.

== Description ==
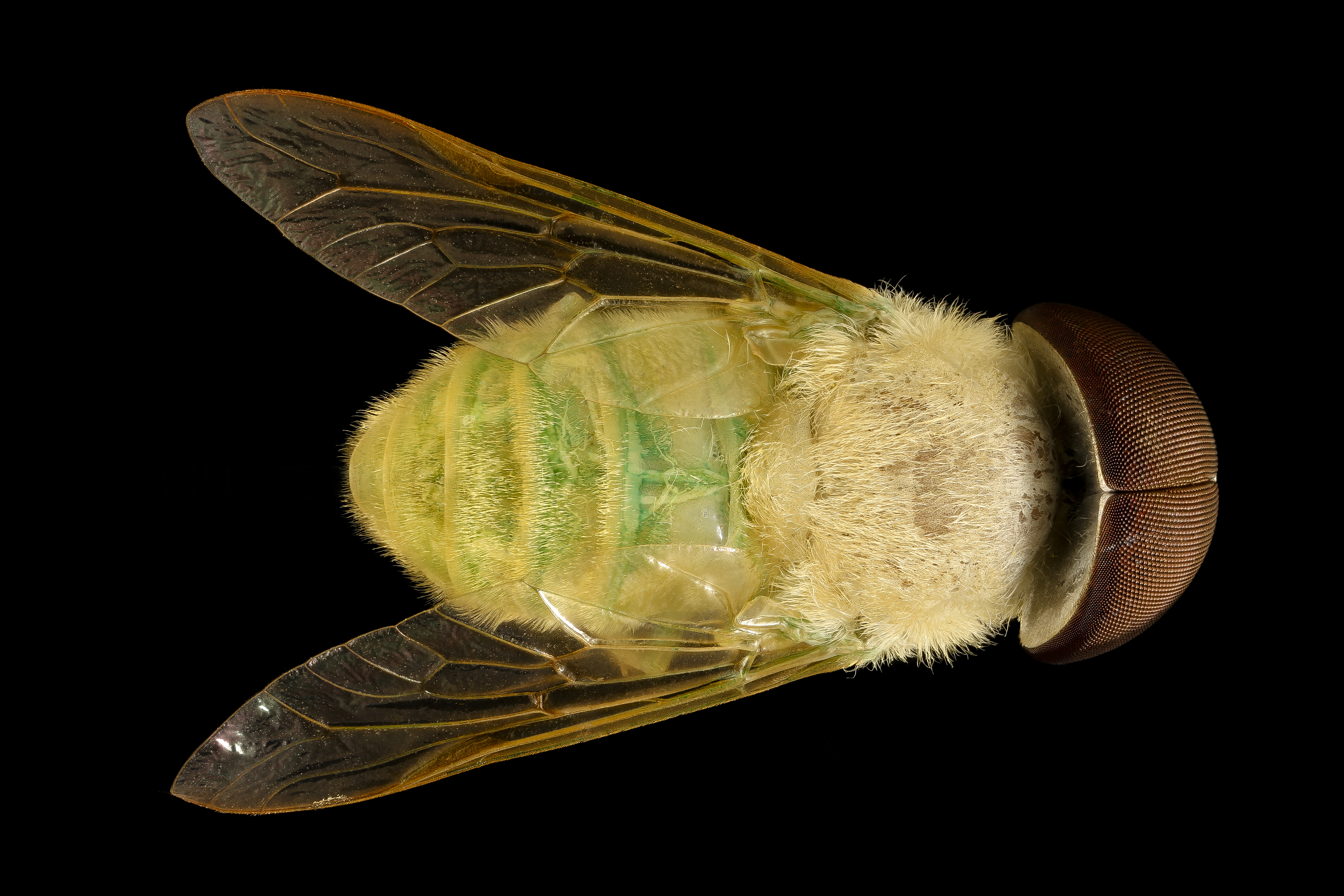
Dorsal view of male individual of Chlorotabanus crepulscularis

Most notable characteristic is that the all species under this genus have a pale green body color and solid colored eyes. Other key features are the sclerotized labella and the lack of a frontal callus.

They resemble Phaeotabanus in structure the most compared to other Tabanids.

== Distribution ==
Majority of this genus can be found in South America, while only one species (Chlorotabanus crepuscularis) is endemic to North America.

== Species ==
- Chlorotabanus crepuscularis Bequaert, 1926
- Chlorotabanus fairchildi (Wilkerson, 1979)
- Chlorotabanus falsiflagellatus (Krolow & Henriques, 2010)
- Chlorotabanus flagellatus (Krolow & Henriques, 2009)
- Chlorotabanus inanis (Fabricius, 1787)
- Chlorotabanus leucochlorus (Fairchild, 1961)
- Chlorotabanus leuconotus (Krolow & Henriques, 2010)
- Chlorotabanus mexicanus (Linnaeus, 1758)
- Chlorotabanus microceratus (Krolow & Henriques, 2010)
- Chlorotabanus ochreus (Philip & Fairchild, 1956)
- Chlorotabanus parviceps (Kröber, 1934)
