= Protosilvius =

Scientific classification
- Kingdom: Animalia
- Phylum: Arthropoda
- Clade: Pancrustacea
- Class: Insecta
- Order: Diptera
- Family: Tabanidae
- Subfamily: Pangoniinae
- Tribe: Pangoniini
- Genus: Protosilvius; Enderlein, 1922

Type species
- Protosilvius termitiformis Enderlein, 1922

Synonyms
- Histriosilvius Kröber, 1930

Genus of flies

Protosilvius is a genus of flies in the family Tabanidae.

== Species ==
- Protosilvius gurupi Rafael, Marques & Limeira-de-Oliveira, 2012
- Protosilvius inopinatus Zeegers, 2015
- Protosilvius longipalpis (Macquart, 1848)
- Protosilvius mackerrasi Fairchild, 1962
- Protosilvius phoeniculus Fairchild, 1962
- Protosilvius priscus Fairchild, 1962
- Protosilvius termitiformis Enderlein, 1922
