= Philipotabanus =

Scientific classification
- Kingdom: Animalia
- Phylum: Arthropoda
- Class: Insecta
- Order: Diptera
- Family: Tabanidae
- Subfamily: Tabaninae
- Tribe: Diachlorini
- Genus: Philipotabanus; Fairchild, 1943

Type species
- Tabanus ebrius Osten Sacken, 1886

Genus of flies

Philipotabanus is a genus of horse fly belonging to the family Tabanidae subfamily Tabaninae.

== Species ==
- Philipotabanus annectans Fairchild, 1975
- Philipotabanus caliginosus (Bellardi, 1859)
- Philipotabanus chrysothrix (Fairchild, 1943)
- Philipotabanus criton (Kröber, 1934)
- Philipotabanus ebrius (Osten Sacken, 1886)
- Philipotabanus ecuadoriensis (Kröber, 1930)
- Philipotabanus elviae (Fairchild, 1943)
- Philipotabanus engimus Philip, 1954
- Philipotabanus fascipennis (Macquart, 1846)
- Philipotabanus fucosus Fairchild, 1958
- Philipotabanus inauratus (Fairchild, 1947)
- Philipotabanus keenani (Fairchild, 1947)
- Philipotabanus kompi (Fairchild, 1943)
- Philipotabanus magnificus (Kröber, 1934)
- Philipotabanus medius (Kröber, 1934)
- Philipotabanus nigrinubilus (Fairchild, 1953)
- Philipotabanus nigripennis Wilkerson, 1979
- Philipotabanus obidensis Henriques, 2006
- Philipotabanus opimus Fairchild, 1975
- Philipotabanus pallidetinctus (Kröber, 1930)
- Philipotabanus phalaropygus Fairchild, 1964
- Philipotabanus pictus Gorayeb & Rafael, 1984
- Philipotabanus plenus (Hine, 1907)
- Philipotabanus porteri Fairchild, 1975
- Philipotabanus pterographicus (Fairchild, 1943)
- Philipotabanus reticulatus (Kröber, 1930)
- Philipotabanus stigmaticalis (Kröber, 1931)
- Philipotabanus tanypterus Wilkerson, 1979
- Philipotabanus tenuifasciatus (Kröber, 1930)
- Philipotabanus unimaculus (Kröber, 1934)
- Philipotabanus vulpinus Fairchild, 1975
