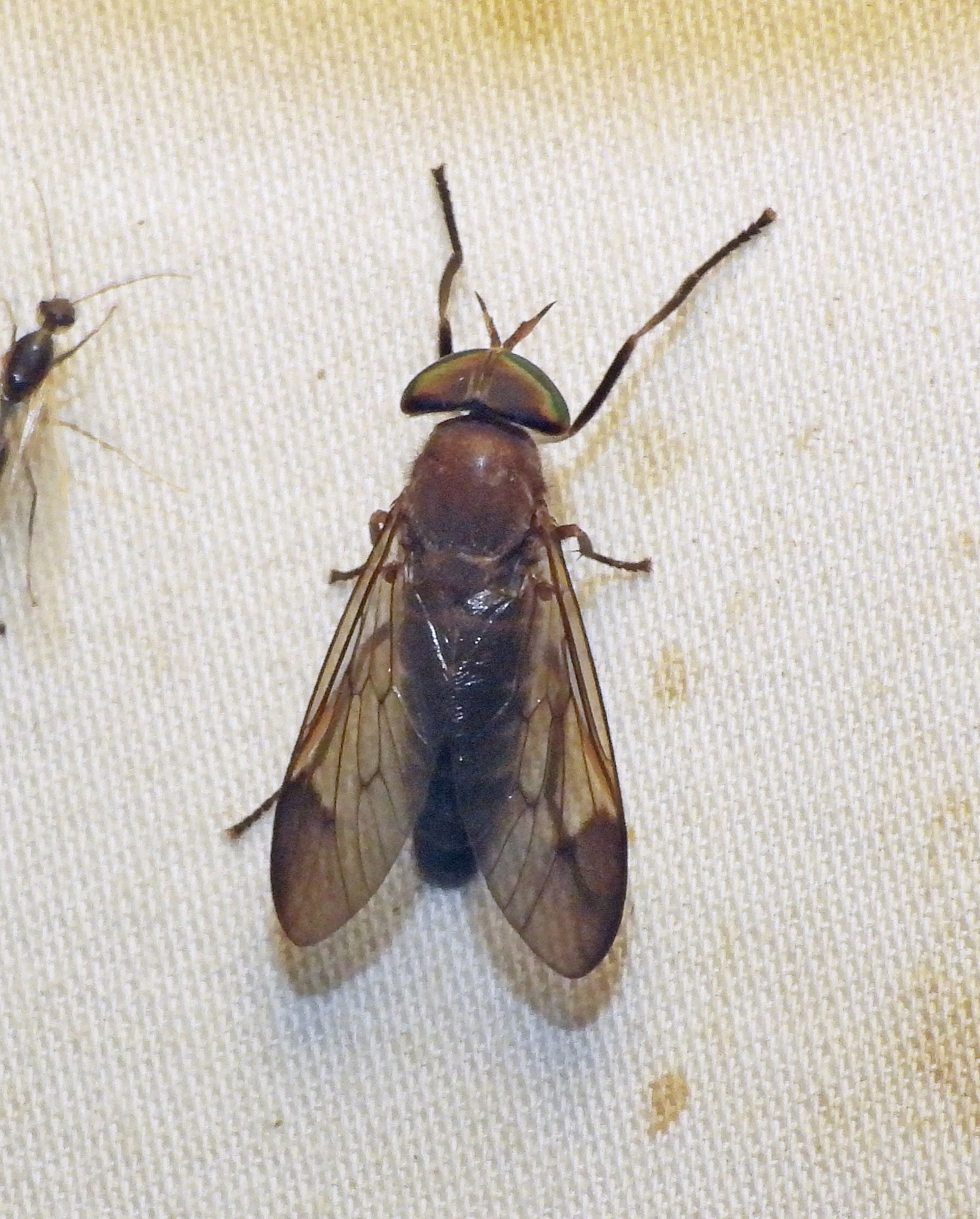
- Stypommisa apicalis

Scientific classification
- Kingdom: Animalia
- Phylum: Arthropoda
- Clade: Pancrustacea
- Class: Insecta
- Order: Diptera
- Family: Tabanidae
- Subfamily: Tabaninae
- Tribe: Diachlorini
- Genus: Stypommisa; Enderlein, 1923

Type species
- Stypommisa punctipennis Enderlein, 1923

Synonyms
- Stictotabanus Lutz, 1914; Dudaella Strand, 1932; Enderleiniella Kröber, 1932

= Stypommisa =

Genus of flies

Stypommisa is a genus of horse flies in the family Tabanidae.

== Species ==
- Stypommisa abdominalis (Philip, 1960)
- Stypommisa affinus Kröber, 1929
- Stypommisa anoriensis Fairchild & Wilkerson, 1986
- Stypommisa antennina Philip, 1970
- Stypommisa apaches Philip, 1977
- Stypommisa apicalis Fairchild & Wilkerson, 1986
- Stypommisa aripuana Fairchild & Wilkerson, 1986
- Stypommisa bipuncta Fairchild, 1979
- Stypommisa bolviensis (Kröber, 1930)
- Stypommisa callicera (Bigot, 1892)
- Stypommisa captiroptera (Kröber, 1930)
- Stypommisa changena Fairchild, 1986
- Stypommisa ferruginosa (Walker, 1850)
- Stypommisa flavescens (Kröber, 1930)
- Stypommisa fulviventris (Macquart, 1846)
- Stypommisa furva (Hine, 1920)
- Stypommisa glandicolor (Lutz, 1912)
- Stypommisa hypographa (Kröber, 1930)
- Stypommisa jaculator (Fairchild, 1942)
- Stypommisa kroeberi Fairchild & Wilkerson, 1986
- Stypommisa lerida (Fairchild, 1942)
- Stypommisa maruccii (Fairchild, 1947)
- Stypommisa modica (Hine, 1920)
- Stypommisa paraguayensis (Kröber, 1930)
- Stypommisa pequeniensis (Fairchild, 1942)
- Stypommisa punctipennis Enderlein, 1923
- Stypommisa ramosi Gorayeb & Fairchild, 1987
- Stypommisa rubrithorax (Macquart, 1838)
- Stypommisa scythropa (Schiner, 1868)
- Stypommisa serena (Kröber, 1931)
- Stypommisa spilota Fairchild & Wilkerson, 1986
- Stypommisa tantula (Hine, 1920)
- Stypommisa u-nigrum Philip, 1977
- Stypommisa venosa (Bigot, 1892)
- Stypommisa vidali Rafael, Gorayeb & Rosa, 1992
- Stypommisa xanthicornis Fairchild & Wilkerson, 1986
