= Scione (fly) =

Scientific classification
- Kingdom: Animalia
- Phylum: Arthropoda
- Class: Insecta
- Order: Diptera
- Family: Tabanidae
- Subfamily: Pangoniinae
- Tribe: Scionini
- Genus: Scione; Walker, 1850

Type species
- Pangonia incompleta Macquart, 1846

Synonyms
- Clanis Walker, 1850; Diclisa Schiner, 1867; Rhinotriclista Enderlein, 1922

Genus of flies

Scione is a genus of flies in the family Tabanidae.

== Species ==
- Scione ablusus Fairchild, 1964
- Scione acer Philip, 1958
- Scione albifasciata (Macquart, 1846)
- Scione albohirta Kröber, 1930
- Scione albopilosus Burger, 2002
- Scione aurulans (Wiedemann, 1830)
- Scione bilineata Philip, 1968
- Scione brevibeccus Wilkerson, 1979
- Scione brevistriga Enderlein, 1925
- Scione cingulata (Enderlein, 1925)
- Scione claripennis Ricardo, 1900
- Scione costaricana Szilády, 1926
- Scione crassa Szilády, 1926
- Scione cupreus Wilkerson, 1979
- Scione distincta (Schiner, 1868)
- Scione equatoriensis Surcouf, 1919
- Scione equivexans Wilkerson, 1979
- Scione flavescens (Enderlein, 1930)
- Scione flavohirta Ricardo, 1902
- Scione fulva Ricardo, 1902
- Scione fumipennis Kröber, 1930
- Scione fusca Ricardo, 1900
- Scione grandis Philip, 1943
- Scione huancabambae Kröber, 1930
- Scione immaculata (Kröber, 1930)
- Scione incompleta (Macquart, 1846)
- Scione limbativena Enderlein, 1925
- Scione longirostris Brèthes, 1920
- Scione maculipennis (Schiner, 1868)
- Scione minor (Macquart, 1847)
- Scione minuta Szilády, 1926
- Scione nigripes (Kröber, 1930)
- Scione obscurefemorata Kröber, 1930
- Scione picta Szilády, 1926
- Scione punctata Szilády, 1926
- Scione rhinothrix Wilkerson, 1979
- Scione rufescens (Ricardo, 1900)
- Scione rufipes (Kröber, 1930)
- Scione serratus Wilkerson, 1979
- Scione strigata (Enderlein, 1925)
- Scione youngi Wilkerson, 1979
