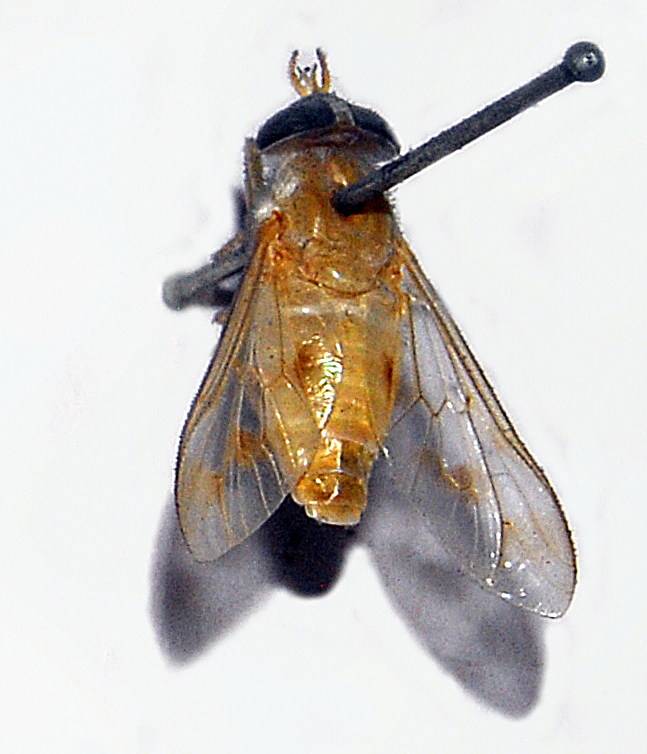
- Dichelacera alcicornis

Scientific classification
- Kingdom: Animalia
- Phylum: Arthropoda
- Class: Insecta
- Order: Diptera
- Family: Tabanidae
- Subfamily: Tabaninae
- Tribe: Diachlorini
- Genus: Dichelacera; Macquart, 1838

Type species
- Tabanus cervicornis Fabricius, 1805

= Dichelacera =

Genus of flies

Dichelacera is a genus of horse flies in the family Tabanidae.

== Species ==
- Dichelacera abbreviata Philip, 1968
- Dichelacera adusta Wilkerson, 1981
- Dichelacera albifasciata Fairchild & Philip, 1960
- Dichelacera albitibialis Burger, 1999
- Dichelacera albomarginata (Kröber, 1930)
- Dichelacera alcicornis (Wiedemann, 1828)
- Dichelacera almeidai Lima, Krolow & Henriques, 2018
- Dichelacera amazonensis Henriques, 1994
- Dichelacera ambigua (Lutz & Neiva, 1914)
- Dichelacera amilcar Fairchild, 1964
- Dichelacera anodonta Burger, 1999
- Dichelacera antunesi Fairchild & Philip, 1960
- Dichelacera apicalis (Fairchild, 1939)
- Dichelacera aurata Wilkerson, 1979
- Dichelacera auristriata Burger, 1999
- Dichelacera bifacies Walker, 1848
- Dichelacera bolviensis (Brèthes, 1910)
- Dichelacera callosa Lutz, 1915
- Dichelacera caloptera Hine, 1920
- Dichelacera cervicornis (Fabricius, 1805)
- Dichelacera chocoensis Fairchild & Philip, 1960
- Dichelacera cnephosa (Barretto, 1947)
- Dichelacera corumbaensis Barros & Gorayeb, 1995
- Dichelacera costaricana (Fairchild, 1941)
- Dichelacera crocata Fairchild, 1953
- Dichelacera damicornis (Fabricius, 1805)
- Dichelacera deliciae Fairchild & Philip, 1960
- Dichelacera diaphorina (Barretto, 1947)
- Dichelacera dorotheae Fairchild & Philip, 1960
- Dichelacera fairchildi Burger, 1999
- Dichelacera fasciata Walker, 1850
- Dichelacera flavescens (Thunberg, 1827)
- Dichelacera flavicosta Wilkerson, 1981
- Dichelacera fuscinervis (Barretto, 1950)
- Dichelacera fuscipes Lutz, 1915
- Dichelacera gamma (Kröber, 1931)
- Dichelacera grandis Ricardo, 1904
- Dichelacera hartmanni Fairchild & Philip, 1960
- Dichelacera hubbelli Fairchild & Philip, 1960
- Dichelacera imfasciata Fairchild & Philip, 1960
- Dichelacera intermedia Lutz, 1915
- Dichelacera januarii (Wiedemann, 1819)
- Dichelacera lamasi Penaforte & Henriques, 2019
- Dichelacera leucotibialis (Barretto, 1947)
- Dichelacera marginata Macquart, 1847
- Dichelacera melanoptera Hine, 1920
- Dichelacera melanosoma Hine, 1920
- Dichelacera mexicana Fairchild & Philip, 1960
- Dichelacera micracantha Lutz, 1915
- Dichelacera modesta Lutz, 1915
- Dichelacera multiguttata Lutz, 1915
- Dichelacera nigricorpus (Lutz, 1915)
- Dichelacera nubiapex Fairchild & Philip, 1960
- Dichelacera nubipennis Rondani, 1868
- Dichelacera ochracea Hine, 1920
- Dichelacera paraensis Henriques, 1994
- Dichelacera parvidens (Enderlein, 1925)
- Dichelacera princessa Fairchild & Philip, 1960
- Dichelacera pulchra Williston, 1901
- Dichelacera pulchroides Fairchild & Philip, 1960
- Dichelacera pullata Fairchild & Philip, 1960
- Dichelacera regina Fairchild, 1940
- Dichelacera rex Fairchild, 1951
- Dichelacera rubricosa (Wulp, 1881)
- Dichelacera rubrofemorata Burger, 1999
- Dichelacera scapularis Macquart, 1847
- Dichelacera scutellata Williston, 1895
- Dichelacera serrata Fairchild & Philip, 1960
- Dichelacera steleiothorax (Barretto, 1947)
- Dichelacera striata Henriques, 1994
- Dichelacera subcallosa Fairchild & Philip, 1960
- Dichelacera submarginata Lutz, 1915
- Dichelacera t-nigrum (Fabricius, 1805)
- Dichelacera tenuicornis (Lutz, 1915)
- Dichelacera tetradelta Henriques, 1994
- Dichelacera transposita Walker, 1854
- Dichelacera trigonifera (Schiner, 1868)
- Dichelacera trisulca Fairchild & Philip, 1960
- Dichelacera unifasciata Macquart, 1838
- Dichelacera varia (Wiedemann, 1828)
- Dichelacera variegata Burger, 1999
- Dichelacera villavoensis Fairchild & Philip, 1960
- Dichelacera walteri Guimarães, Gorayeb & Rodrigues-Guimarães, 2015
