= Pityocera =

Scientific classification
- Kingdom: Animalia
- Phylum: Arthropoda
- Class: Insecta
- Order: Diptera
- Family: Tabanidae
- Subfamily: Pangoniinae
- Tribe: Scionini
- Genus: Pityocera; Giglio-Tos, 1896

Type species
- Pityocera festae Giglio-Tos, 1896

Genus of flies

Pityocera is a genus of flies in the family Tabanidae.

== Species ==
- Pityocera barrosi Gorayeb & Krolow, 2015
- Pityocera cervus (Wiedemann, 1828)
- Pityocera ecuadorensis Buestan & Krolow, 2015
- Pityocera festae Giglio-Tos, 1896
- Pityocera gorayebi Limeira-de-Oliveira & Krolow, 2015
- Pityocera nana (Walker, 1850)
- Pityocera nigribasis Fairchild, 1964
- Pityocera patellicornis Kröber, 1930
- Pityocera pernaquila Gorayeb & Krolow, 2015
- Pityocera rhinolissa Krolow & Henriques, 2015
