= Aegophagamyia =

Scientific classification
- Kingdom: Animalia
- Phylum: Arthropoda
- Class: Insecta
- Order: Diptera
- Family: Tabanidae
- Subfamily: Chrysopsinae
- Tribe: Bouvieromyiini
- Genus: Aegophagamyia; Austen, 1912

Type species
- Aegophagamyia pugens Austen, 1912

Genus of flies

Aegophagamyia is a genus of horse flies in the family Tabanidae.

== Species ==
- Aegophagamyia flava (Surcouf, 1909)
- Aegophagamyia alluaudi (Giglio-Tos, 1895)
- Aegophagamyia bekilyana (Séguy, 1938)
- Aegophagamyia bengalia (Séguy, 1938)
- Aegophagamyia bivittata (Enderlein, 1925)
- Aegophagamyia brunnea (Surcouf, 1909)
- Aegophagamyia chopardi (Surcouf, 1913)
- Aegophagamyia cincta (Surcouf, 1909)
- Aegophagamyia comorensis (Enderlein, 1925)
- Aegophagamyia confusa (Surcouf, 1913)
- Aegophagamyia hildebrandti (Enderlein, 1923)
- Aegophagamyia inornata (Austen, 1920)
- Aegophagamyia longirostris (Séguy, 1950)
- Aegophagamyia lurida (Enderlein, 1923)
- Aegophagamyia macrops (Séguy, 1950)
- Aegophagamyia nebulosa (Séguy, 1950)
- Aegophagamyia notata (Surcouf, 1909)
- Aegophagamyia proxima (Surcouf, 1909)
- Aegophagamyia pulchella (Austen, 1912)
- Aegophagamyia seyrigi (Séguy, 1938)
- Aegophagamyia syrphoides (Enderlein, 1934)
- Aegophagamyia variegata (Surcouf, 1909)
- Aegophagamyia aurea Oldroyd, 1957
- Aegophagamyia austeni Oldroyd, 1957
- Aegophagamyia basalis Oldroyd, 1960
- Aegophagamyia brunnipes Burger, 1992
- Aegophagamyia chaineyi Burger, 1992
- Aegophagamyia completa Oldroyd, 1957
- Aegophagamyia grisea Oldroyd, 1960
- Aegophagamyia keiseri Oldroyd, 1960
- Aegophagamyia lata Oldroyd, 1963
- Aegophagamyia pungens Austen, 1912
- Aegophagamyia remota Austen, 1912
- Aegophagamyia vadoni Oldroyd, 1957
- Aegophagamyia xanthomera Oldroyd, 1957
- Aegophagamyia zeus Oldroyd, 1957
