= Catachlorops =

Scientific classification
- Kingdom: Animalia
- Phylum: Arthropoda
- Clade: Pancrustacea
- Class: Insecta
- Order: Diptera
- Family: Tabanidae
- Subfamily: Tabaninae
- Tribe: Diachlorini
- Genus: Catachlorops; Lutz, 1909

Type species
- Dichelacera fuscipennis Macquart, 1847

Genus of flies

Catachlorops is a genus of horse flies in the family Tabanidae.

== Species ==
- Catachlorops alcis (Williston, 1896)
- Catachlorops alphus Wilkerson, 1979
- Catachlorops amazonicus Loureiro Henriques & Gorayeb, 1999
- Catachlorops auripilis (Philip, 1960)
- Catachlorops bahianus Fairchild, 1940
- Catachlorops balachowskyi Fairchild, 1970
- Catachlorops balioptera Gorayeb, 1991
- Catachlorops beameri (Philip, 1958)
- Catachlorops bicolor (Kröber, 1931)
- Catachlorops bindai Rafael, Gorayeb & Rosa, 1992
- Catachlorops bogotanus (Enderlein, 1922)
- Catachlorops borgmeieri Lane, 1936
- Catachlorops capreolus (Wiedemann, 1828)
- Catachlorops carrerai Barretto, 1946
- Catachlorops circumfusus (Wiedemann, 1830)
- Catachlorops conspicuus (Lutz & Neiva, 1914)
- Catachlorops dalmeidai Pechuman, 1946
- Catachlorops difficilis (Kröber, 1931)
- Catachlorops ecuadoriensis (Enderlein, 1925)
- Catachlorops ferrugineus (Barretto, 1948)
- Catachlorops flavus (Wiedemann, 1828)
- Catachlorops fonsecai Barretto, 1946
- Catachlorops fortunensis Fairchild, 1986
- Catachlorops fulmineus (Hine, 1920)
- Catachlorops fumipennis Kröber, 1931
- Catachlorops furcatus (Wiedemann, 1828)
- Catachlorops fuscinervis (Macquart, 1838)
- Catachlorops fuscivittatus (Barretto, 1948)
- Catachlorops halteratus Kröber, 1931
- Catachlorops immaculatus (Macquart, 1838)
- Catachlorops lanei Barretto, 1946
- Catachlorops leptogaster Barretto, 1946
- Catachlorops lineatus Burger, 1999
- Catachlorops luctuosus (Macquart, 1838)
- Catachlorops maculatus Burger, 1999
- Catachlorops medemi Philip, 1970
- Catachlorops mellosus Loureiro Henriques & Gorayeb, 1999
- Catachlorops muscosus (Enderlein, 1922)
- Catachlorops nebulosus Kröber, 1931
- Catachlorops niger (Kröber, 1931)
- Catachlorops nigripalpis (Macquart, 1846)
- Catachlorops nigriventer Barretto, 1946
- Catachlorops overali Fairchild & Rafael, 1985
- Catachlorops pechumani (Barretto, 1948)
- Catachlorops phaeopterus (Barretto, 1948)
- Catachlorops plagiatus (Brèthes, 1910)
- Catachlorops potator (Wiedemann, 1828)
- Catachlorops praetereuns (Walker, 1850)
- Catachlorops psolopterus (Wiedemann, 1828)
- Catachlorops quadrimaculatus (Macquart, 1846)
- Catachlorops rubiginosus (Summers, 1911)
- Catachlorops rufescens (Fabricius, 1805)
- Catachlorops rufipennis (Macquart, 1838)
- Catachlorops rufithorax (Walker, 1848)
- Catachlorops scurrus (Fairchild, 1958)
- Catachlorops scutellatus (Macquart, 1838)
- Catachlorops siculus Wilkerson, 1979
- Catachlorops striatus Burger, 1999
- Catachlorops testaceus (Macquart, 1846)
- Catachlorops therioplectiformis Kröber, 1931
- Catachlorops umbratus (Hine, 1920)
- Catachlorops unicolor (Lutz, 1912)
- Catachlorops vespertinus (Bequaert & Renjifo-Salcedo, 1946)
- Catachlorops victoria (Fairchild, 1940)
- Catachlorops zikani Barretto, 1946
