= Neavella =

Scientific classification
- Kingdom: Animalia
- Phylum: Arthropoda
- Class: Insecta
- Order: Diptera
- Family: Tabanidae
- Subfamily: Tabaninae
- Tribe: Diachlorini
- Genus: Neavella; Oldroyd, 1954

Type species
- Tabanus producticornis Austen, 1912

Genus of flies

Neavella is a genus of horse flies in the family Tabanidae.

== Species ==
- Neavella albipectus (Bigot, 1859)
- Neavella madagascariensis Chainey & Timmer, 1986
- Neavella nerstraeteni Leclercq, 1982
- Neavella notopleuralis Oldroyd, 1954
- Neavella producticornis (Austen, 1912)
- Neavella verstraeteni Leclercq, 1981
