= Dicladocera =

Scientific classification
- Kingdom: Animalia
- Phylum: Arthropoda
- Class: Insecta
- Order: Diptera
- Family: Tabanidae
- Subfamily: Tabaninae
- Tribe: Diachlorini
- Genus: Dicladocera; Lutz, 1913

Type species
- Tabanus guttipennis Wiedemann, 1828

Genus of insects

Dicladocera is a genus of biting horseflies of the family Tabanidae.

== Species ==
- Dicladocera argentomacula Wilkerson, 1979
- Dicladocera basirufa (Walker, 1850)
- Dicladocera beaveri Wilkerson, 1979
- Dicladocera bellicosa (Brèthes, 1910)
- Dicladocera calimaensis Wilkerson, 1979
- Dicladocera castanea (Barretto, 1949)
- Dicladocera clara (Schiner, 1868)
- Dicladocera curta Kröber, 1931
- Dicladocera dalessandroi Wilkerson, 1979
- Dicladocera distomacula Wilkerson, 1979
- Dicladocera exilicorne Fairchild, 1958
- Dicladocera fairchildi Goodwin, 1999
- Dicladocera fulvicornis Kröber, 1931
- Dicladocera griseipennis Kröber, 1931
- Dicladocera guttipennis (Wiedemann, 1828)
- Dicladocera hemiptera (Surcouf, 1912)
- Dicladocera hirsuta Wilkerson, 1979
- Dicladocera hoppi Enderlein, 1927
- Dicladocera leei Fairchild, 1979
- Dicladocera macula (Macquart, 1846)
- Dicladocera maculistigma Enderlein, 1925
- Dicladocera minos (Schiner, 1868)
- Dicladocera molle Coscarón, 1967
- Dicladocera mutata Fairchild, 1958
- Dicladocera neosubmacula Kröber, 1931
- Dicladocera nigrocaerulea (Rondani, 1850)
- Dicladocera nova Kröber, 1931
- Dicladocera ornatipenne (Kröber, 1931)
- Dicladocera perplexus (Walker, 1850)
- Dicladocera pruinosa Wilkerson, 1979
- Dicladocera riveti (Surcouf, 1919)
- Dicladocera rubiginipennis (Macquart, 1846)
- Dicladocera simplex (Walker, 1850)
- Dicladocera submacula (Walker, 1850)
- Dicladocera tribonophora Fairchild, 1958
- Dicladocera uncinata (Wulp, 1881)
