= Spilotabanus =

Scientific classification
- Kingdom: Animalia
- Phylum: Arthropoda
- Class: Insecta
- Order: Diptera
- Family: Tabanidae
- Subfamily: Tabaninae
- Tribe: Diachlorini
- Genus: Spilotabanus; Fairchild, 1969

Type species
- Tabanus multiguttatus Kröber, 1930

Genus of flies

Spilotabanus is a genus of horse flies in the family Tabanidae.

== Species ==
- Spilotabanus multiguttatus (Kröber, 1930)
- Spilotabanus triaurius Wilkerson, 1979
