= Bolbodimyia =

Scientific classification
- Kingdom: Animalia
- Phylum: Arthropoda
- Class: Insecta
- Order: Diptera
- Family: Tabanidae
- Subfamily: Tabaninae
- Tribe: Diachlorini
- Genus: Bolbodimyia; Bigot, 1892

Type species
- Bolbodimyia bicolor Bigot, 1892

Genus of flies

Bolbodimyia is a genus of horse flies in the family Tabanidae.

== Species ==
- Bolbodimyia atrata (Hine, 1904)
- Bolbodimyia bermudezi Tidwell & Philip, 1977
- Bolbodimyia bicolor Bigot, 1892
- Bolbodimyia brunneipennis Stone, 1954
- Bolbodimyia celeroides Stone, 1954
- Bolbodimyia dampfi Philip, 1954
- Bolbodimyia desescta Enderlein, 1925
- Bolbodimyia erythrocephala (Bigot, 1892)
- Bolbodimyia galindoi Fairchild, 1964
- Bolbodimyia lampros Philip & Floyd, 1974
- Bolbodimyia lateralis Kröber, 1930
- Bolbodimyia nigra Stone, 1934
- Bolbodimyia philipi Stone, 1954
