= Dasychela =

Scientific classification
- Kingdom: Animalia
- Phylum: Arthropoda
- Clade: Pancrustacea
- Class: Insecta
- Order: Diptera
- Family: Tabanidae
- Subfamily: Tabaninae
- Tribe: Diachlorini
- Genus: Dasychela; Enderlein, 1922

Type species
- Dasychela limbativena Enderlein, 1922

Genus of insects

Dasychela is a genus of biting horseflies of the family Tabanidae. There are 8 species with a neotropical distribution, with one—D. badia—found in Central America.

== Species ==
- Dasychela badia (Kröber, 1931)
- Dasychela inca (Philip, 1960)
- Dasychela ocellus (Walker, 1848)
- Dasychela peruviana (Bigot, 1892)
- Dasychela macintyrei (Bequaert, 1937)
- Dasychela biramula Fairchild, 1958
- Dasychela limbativena Enderlein, 1922
