= Cretotabanus =

Scientific classification
- Kingdom: Animalia
- Phylum: Arthropoda
- Class: Insecta
- Order: Diptera
- Family: Tabanidae
- Subfamily: Tabaninae
- Tribe: Diachlorini
- Genus: Cretotabanus; Fairchild, 1969

Type species
- Stenotabanus cretatus Fairchild, 1961

Genus of flies

Cretotabanus is a genus of horse flies in the family Tabanidae.

== Species ==
- Cretotabanus cretatus (Fairchild, 1961)
- Cretotabanus newjerseyensis Grimaldi, 2011
