= Chasmia =

Scientific classification
- Kingdom: Animalia
- Phylum: Arthropoda
- Clade: Pancrustacea
- Class: Insecta
- Order: Diptera
- Family: Tabanidae
- Subfamily: Tabaninae
- Tribe: Diachlorini
- Genus: Chasmia; Enderlein, 1922

Type species
- Dasychela bicincta Enderlein, 1922

Genus of insects

Dasychela is a genus of biting horseflies of the family Tabanidae.

== Species ==
- Chasmia atripes (Schuurmans Stekhoven, 1926)
- Chasmia atriventris (Schuurmans Stekhoven, 1926)
- Chasmia auribarba (Mackerras, 1964)
- Chasmia bifasciata (Meijere, 1913)
- Chasmia bozennae (Trojan, 1991)
- Chasmia breviuscula (Walker, 1865)
- Chasmia brunnea Burger, 1995
- Chasmia conradi (Trojan, 1991)
- Chasmia fasciata (Oldroyd, 1949)
- Chasmia fulgida (Ricardo, 1913)
- Chasmia insularis (Mackerras, 1964)
- Chasmia leszeki (Trojan, 1991)
- Chasmia lineata Mackerras, 1971
- Chasmia maculata Burger, 1995
- Chasmia neocaledonica Burger, 1995
- Chasmia nigrifrons Mackerras, 1971
- Chasmia ochrothorax (Schuurmans Stekhoven, 1926)
- Chasmia ornata Mackerras, 1971
- Chasmia orthellioides Mackerras, 1971
- Chasmia parva (Oldroyd, 1949)
- Chasmia parvacallosa (Oldroyd, 1949)
- Chasmia queenslandensis Daniels, 2011
- Chasmia raffreyi (Bigot, 1892)
- Chasmia subhastata (Oldroyd, 1949)
- Chasmia variegata (Schuurmans Stekhoven, 1926)
