= Hemichrysops =

Scientific classification
- Kingdom: Animalia
- Phylum: Arthropoda
- Class: Insecta
- Order: Diptera
- Family: Tabanidae
- Subfamily: Tabaninae
- Tribe: Diachlorini
- Genus: Hemichrysops; Kröber, 1930

Type species
- Hemichrysops fascipennis Kröber, 1930

Genus of flies

Hemichrysops is a genus of horse flies in the family Tabanidae.

== Species ==
- Hemichrysops fascipennis Kröber, 1930
