= Japenoides =

Scientific classification
- Kingdom: Animalia
- Phylum: Arthropoda
- Class: Insecta
- Order: Diptera
- Family: Tabanidae
- Subfamily: Tabaninae
- Tribe: Diachlorini
- Genus: Japenoides; Oldroyd, 1949

Type species
- Japenoides cheesmanae Oldroyd, 1949

Genus of flies

Japenoides is a genus of horse flies in the family Tabanidae.

== Species ==
- Japenoides aureus Mackerras, 1971
- Japenoides cheesmanae Oldroyd, 1949
- Japenoides festivus (Oldroyd, 1949)
- Japenoides nigricostus Mackerras, 1971
- Japenoides oudella (Oldroyd, 1949)
- Japenoides ratcliffei (Mackerras & Rageau, 1958)
- Japenoides veitchi (Bezzi, 1928)
