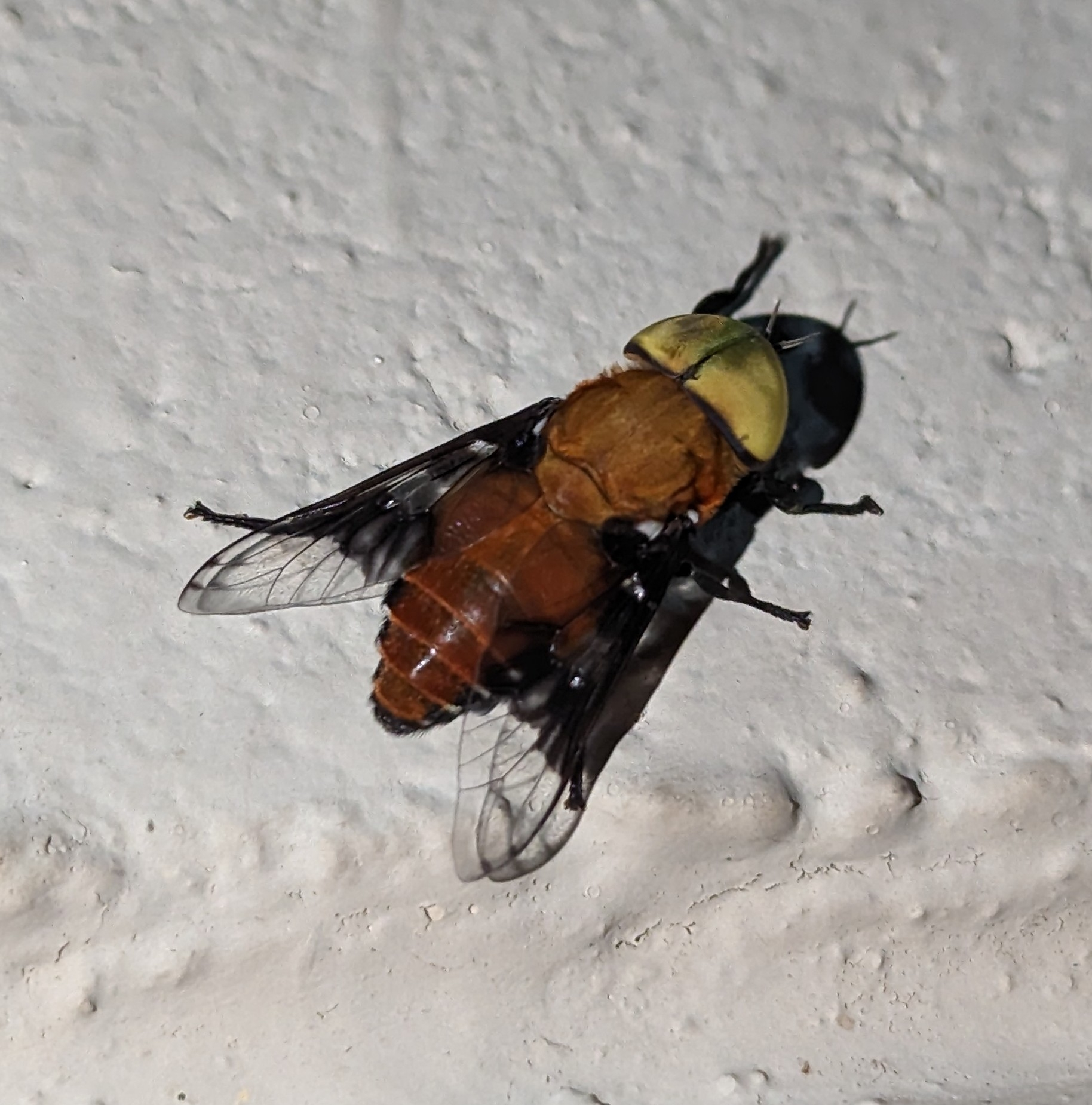
- Ancala africana

Scientific classification
- Kingdom: Animalia
- Phylum: Arthropoda
- Clade: Pancrustacea
- Class: Insecta
- Order: Diptera
- Family: Tabanidae
- Subfamily: Tabaninae
- Tribe: Tabanini
- Genus: Ancala; Enderlein, 1923

Type species
- Tabanus fasciatus Fabricius, 1775

= Ancala =

Genus of flies

Ancala is a genus of horse flies in the family Tabanidae.

== Species ==
- Ancala africana (Gray, 1832)
- Ancala brucei (Ricardo, 1908)
- Ancala fasciata (Fabricius, 1775)
- Ancala latipes (Macquart, 1838)
- Ancala necopina (Austen, 1912)
- Ancala nilotica (Austen, 1906)
- Ancala septempunctata (Ricardo, 1908)
- Ancala subvittata (Ricardo, 1908)
