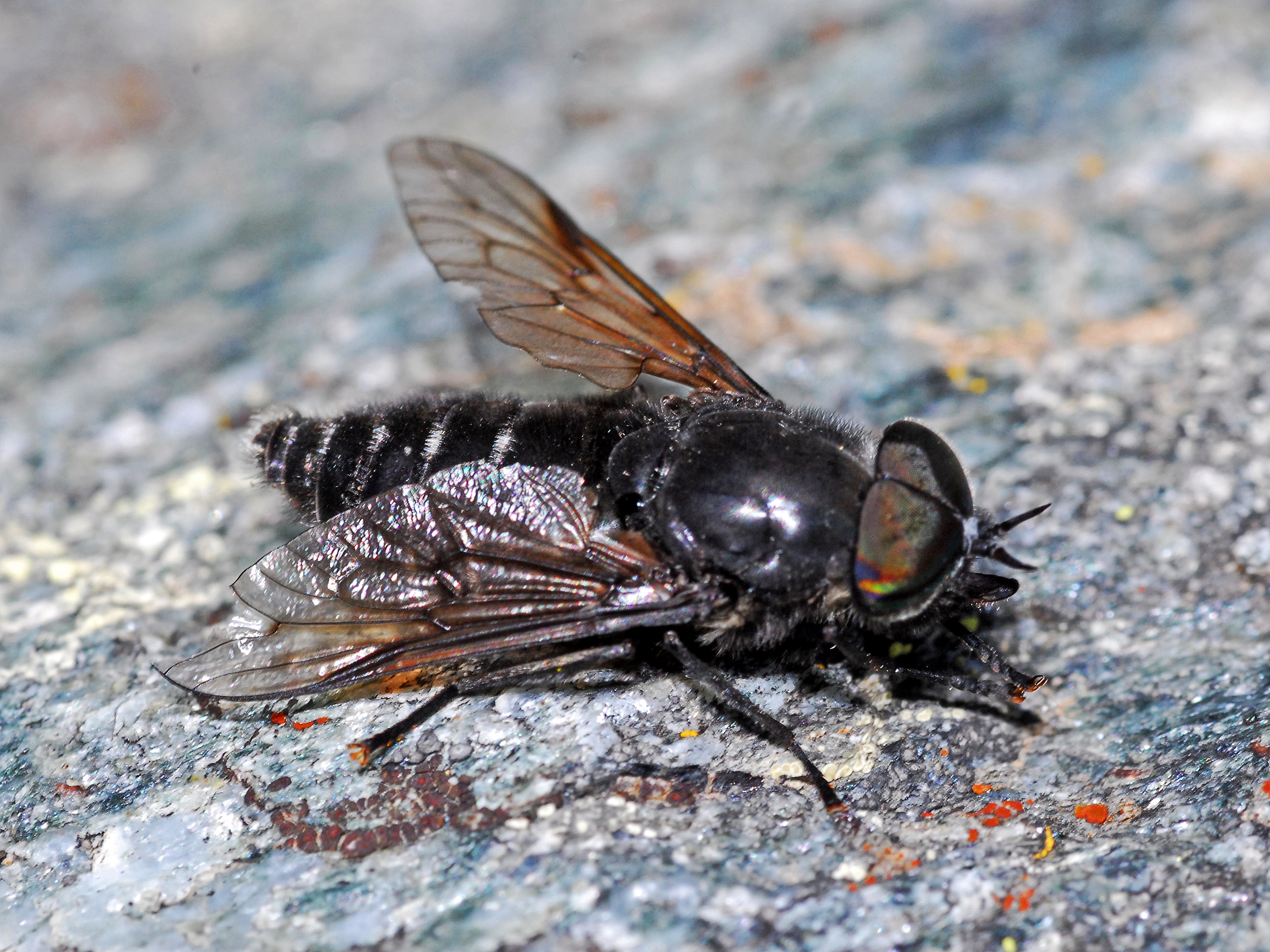
- Dasyrhamphis umbrinus

Scientific classification
- Kingdom: Animalia
- Phylum: Arthropoda
- Class: Insecta
- Order: Diptera
- Family: Tabanidae
- Subfamily: Tabaninae
- Tribe: Diachlorini
- Genus: Dasyrhamphis; Enderlein, 1922

Type species
- Tabanus ater Rossi, 1790

Synonyms
- Efflatounanus Philip, 1948

= Dasyrhamphis =

Genus of insects

Dasyrhamphis is a genus of 'horse fly' belonging to the family Tabanidae subfamily Tabaninae.

== Species ==
- Dasyrhamphis algirus (Macquart, 1838)
- Dasyrhamphis anthracinus (Meigen & Wiedemann, 1820)
- Dasyrhamphis ater (Rossi, 1790)
- Dasyrhamphis carbonarius (Meigen, 1820)
- Dasyrhamphis denticornis (Enderlein, 1925)
- Dasyrhamphis franchinii Leclercq & Olsufiev, 1981
- Dasyrhamphis goleanus (Szilády, 1923)
- Dasyrhamphis insecutor (Austen, 1920)
- Dasyrhamphis kuhedenaensis Ježek, 1981
- Dasyrhamphis nigritus (Fabricius, 1794)
- Dasyrhamphis tomentosus (Macquart, 1846)
- Dasyrhamphis umbrinus (Wiedemann, 1820)
- Dasyrhamphis villosus (Macquart, 1838)

== Bibliography ==
- Chvala M. Family Tabanidae // Catalogue of Palaearctic Diptera. Athericidae-Asilidae / Soós Á. Papp L. [eds]. — Amsterdam: Elsevier Science Publishers, 1988. — Vol. 5. — P. 122–135.
- Leclercq M. Révision systématique et biogéographique des Tabanidae (Diptera) paléarctiques, 3. Sous-famille Tabaninae. Memoirs of the royal institute of natural sciences of Belgium second series. — 1966. — Vol. 80. — P. 5–120.
- Mačukanović-Jocić M., Stešević D., Rančić D. and Stevanović Z. D. Pollen morphology and the flower visitors of Chaerophyllum coloratum L. (Apiaceae) (англ.) // Acta Botanica Croatica. — 2017. — Vol. 76, no. 76. — P. 1–8. — ISSN 0365-0588. — doi:10.1515/botcro-2016-0039.
- Shoeibi B. and Karimpour Y. Contributions to the knowledge of Asilidae (Diptera: Brachycera) from Azarbaijan provinces (Iran) Munis Entomology & Zoology Journal. — 2010. — No. Vol. 5, Suppl.. — P. 957–963.
- Altunsoy F., Kilic A. Y. Karyotype characterization of some Tabanidae (Diptera) species Turkiye Entomoloji Dergisi : 2010. — Vol. 34, no. 4. — P. 477–494. — ISSN 1010-6960.
