= Limata (fly) =

Scientific classification
- Kingdom: Animalia
- Phylum: Arthropoda
- Class: Insecta
- Order: Diptera
- Family: Tabanidae
- Subfamily: Tabaninae
- Tribe: Diachlorini
- Genus: Limata; Oldroyd, 1954

Type species
- Tabanus tenicornis Macquart, 1838

Genus of insects

Limata is a genus of biting horseflies of the family Tabanidae.

== Species ==
- Limata bedfordi Oldroyd, 1954
- Limata capensis (Wiedemann, 1821)
- Limata facialis Oldroyd, 1954
- Limata karooensis Oldroyd, 1954
- Limata kuhnelti Usher, 1967
- Limata laevifrons (Loew, 1858)
- Limata miranda Usher, 1968
- Limata parafacialis Oldroyd, 1957
- Limata seyrigi (Séguy, 1955)
- Limata tenuicornis (Macquart, 1838)
