= Hippocentrum =

Scientific classification
- Kingdom: Animalia
- Phylum: Arthropoda
- Class: Insecta
- Order: Diptera
- Family: Tabanidae
- Subfamily: Tabaninae
- Tribe: Haematopotini
- Genus: Hippocentrum; Austen, 1908

Type species
- Hippocentrum versicolor Austen, 1908

Genus of flies

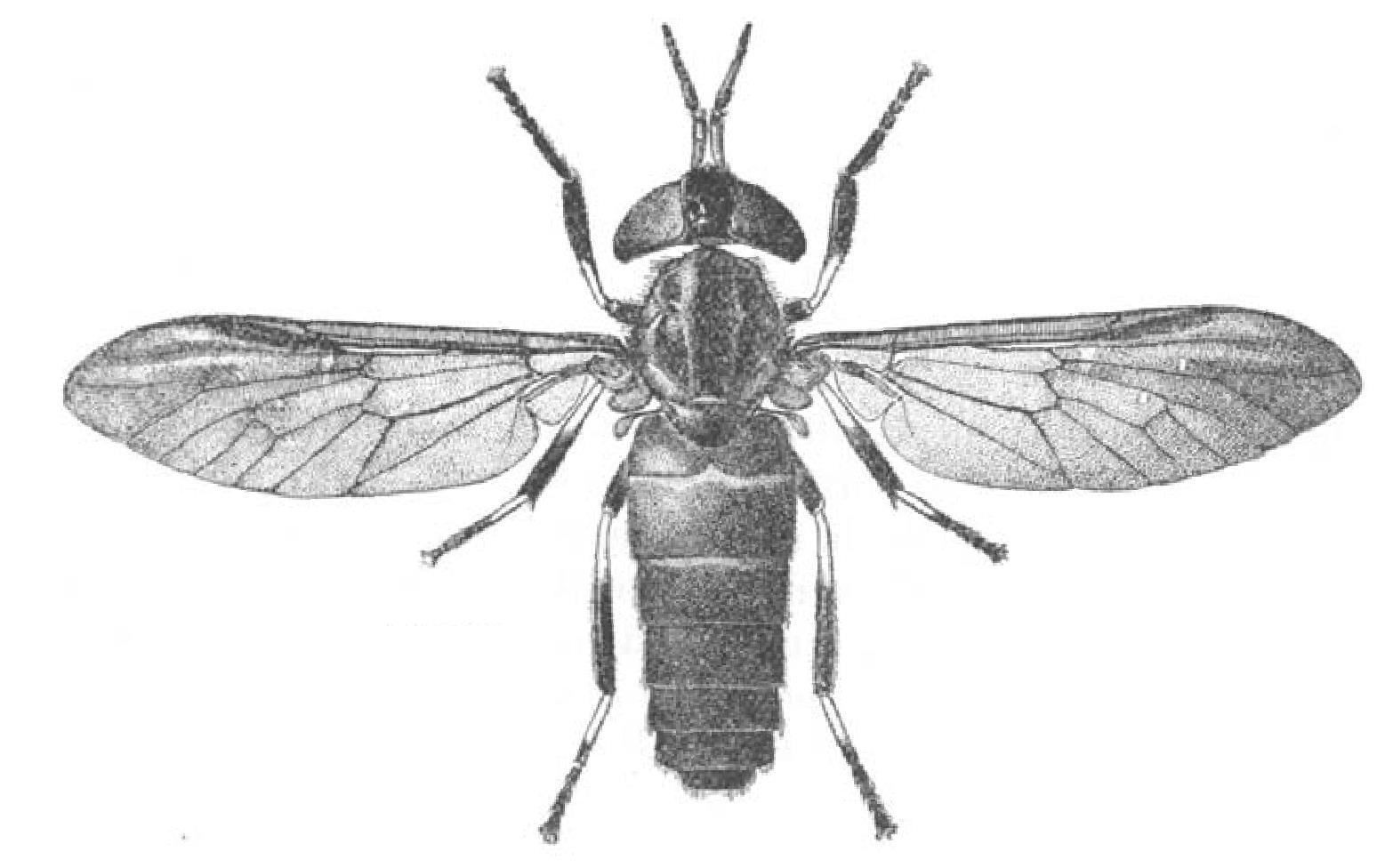
Hippocentrum murphyi

Hippocentrum is a genus of horse flies in the family Tabanidae.

== Species ==
- Hippocentrum concisum Speiser, 1914
- Hippocentrum inappendiculatum (Bigot, 1858)
- Hippocentrum murphyi Austen, 1912
- Hippocentrum strigipenne (Karsch, 1889)
- Hippocentrum versicolor Austen, 1908
