= Eristalotabanus =

Scientific classification
- Kingdom: Animalia
- Phylum: Arthropoda
- Class: Insecta
- Order: Diptera
- Family: Tabanidae
- Subfamily: Tabaninae
- Tribe: Diachlorini
- Genus: Eristalotabanus; Kröber, 1931

Type species
- Eristalotabanus violaceus Kröber, 1931

Genus of insects

Eristalotabanus is a genus of biting horseflies of the family Tabanidae.

== Distribution ==
Ecuador.

== Species ==
- Eristalotabanus violaceus Kröber, 1931
