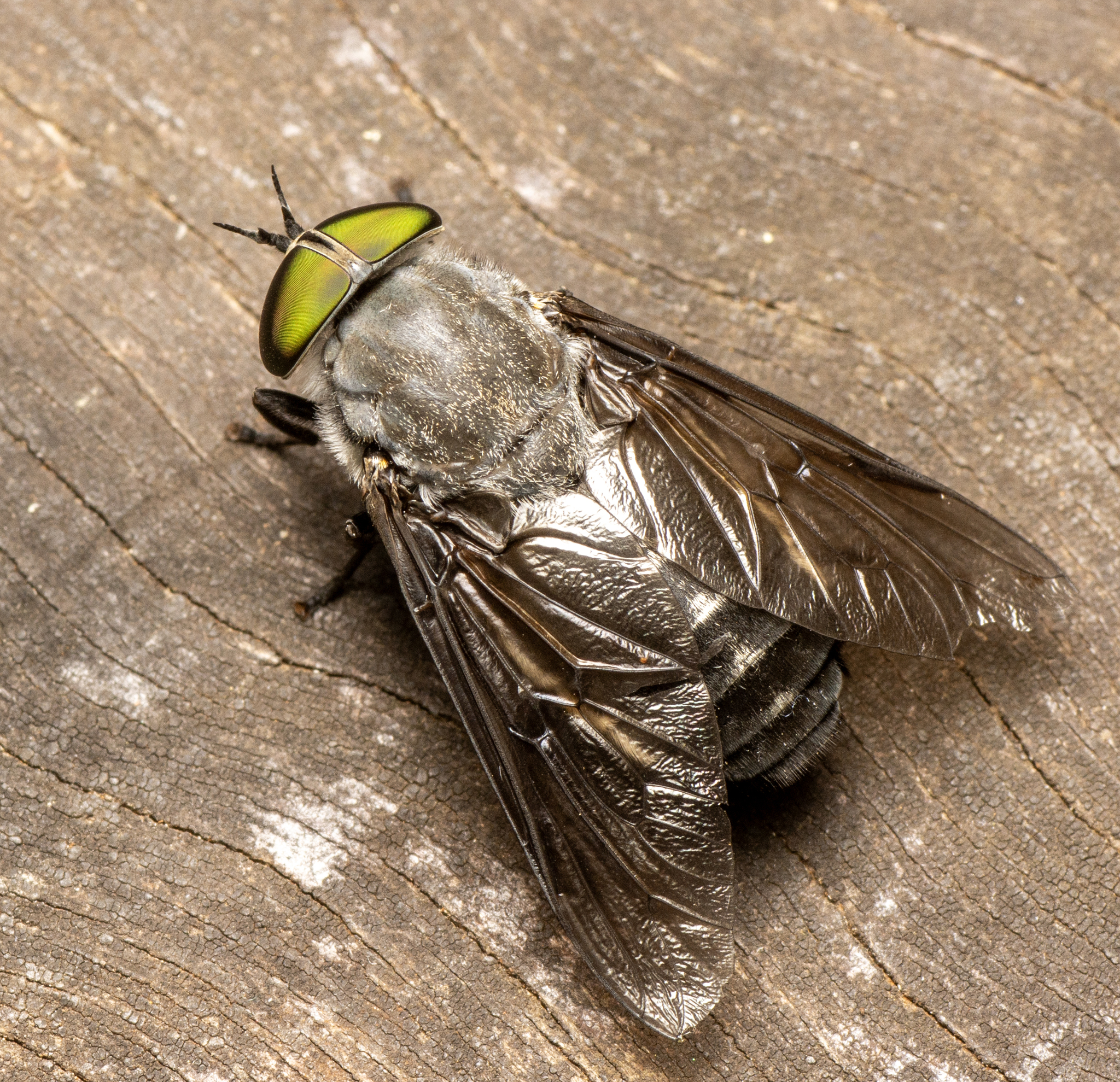

Scientific classification
- Kingdom: Animalia
- Phylum: Arthropoda
- Class: Insecta
- Order: Diptera
- Family: Tabanidae
- Subfamily: Tabaninae
- Tribe: Diachlorini
- Genus: Cydistomyia; Taylor, 1919

Type species
- Cydistomyia doddi Taylor, 1919

Synonyms
- Neotabanus Ricardo, 1911

= Cydistomyia =

Genus of flies

Cydistomyia is a genus of horse flies in the family Tabanidae.

== Species ==
- Cydistomyia abava Philip, 1959
- Cydistomyia aberrans Philip, 1970
- Cydistomyia absol Philip, 1959
- Cydistomyia albidosegmentata (Schuurmans Stekhoven, 1926)
- Cydistomyia albithorax (Ricardo, 1913)
- Cydistomyia amblychroma (Speiser, 1910)
- Cydistomyia angusta (Oldroyd, 1954)
- Cydistomyia assamensis Philip, 1970
- Cydistomyia atmophora (Taylor, 1919)
- Cydistomyia atra (Oldroyd, 1954)
- Cydistomyia atrata Burger, 1995
- Cydistomyia atrostriatus Burger, 2006
- Cydistomyia avida (Bigot, 1892)
- Cydistomyia bancroftae Mackerras, 1964
- Cydistomyia barretti Mackerras, 1964
- Cydistomyia bezzii Mackerras & Rageau, 1958
- Cydistomyia bisecta Oldroyd, 1949
- Cydistomyia brachypalpus Trojan, 1991
- Cydistomyia brevior (Walker, 1848)
- Cydistomyia brunnea Burger, 1982
- Cydistomyia bugnicourti Mackerras & Rageau, 1958
- Cydistomyia caledonica (Ricardo, 1914)
- Cydistomyia casuarinae (English, Mackerras & Dyce, 1958)
- Cydistomyia celebensis (Schuurmans Stekhoven, 1932)
- Cydistomyia ceylonica (Ricardo, 1911)
- Cydistomyia chaineyi Daniels, 1989
- Cydistomyia choiseulensis Burger, 1991
- Cydistomyia cohici Mackerras & Rageau, 1958
- Cydistomyia colasbelcouri Mackerras & Rageau, 1958
- Cydistomyia cooksoni Usher, 1965
- Cydistomyia crepuscularis Oldroyd, 1949
- Cydistomyia curvabilis Mackerras & Spratt, 2008
- Cydistomyia cyanea (Wiedemann, 1828)
- Cydistomyia danielsorum Mackerras & Spratt, 2008
- Cydistomyia danutae Trojan, 1991
- Cydistomyia delicata Philip, 1980
- Cydistomyia diasi Mackerras & Rageau, 1958
- Cydistomyia doddi (Taylor, 1917)
- Cydistomyia duplonotata (Ricardo, 1914)
- Cydistomyia emergens (Oldroyd, 1957)
- Cydistomyia erythrocephala (Wulp, 1869)
- Cydistomyia exemplum Mackerras & Spratt, 2008
- Cydistomyia fenestra Mackerras & Spratt, 2008
- Cydistomyia fergusoni Mackerras & Spratt, 2008
- Cydistomyia fijiensis Burger, 2006
- Cydistomyia frontalis Philip, 1959
- Cydistomyia furcata (Oldroyd, 1954)
- Cydistomyia grayi (Oldroyd, 1957)
- Cydistomyia griseicolor (Ferguson & Hill, 1922)
- Cydistomyia griseiventer (Schuurmans Stekhoven, 1926)
- Cydistomyia hardyi Mackerras & Spratt, 2008
- Cydistomyia heydoni Oldroyd, 1949
- Cydistomyia hollandiensis Mackerras, 1964
- Cydistomyia hyperythrea (Bigot, 1892)
- Cydistomyia ignota Usher, 1965
- Cydistomyia imbecilla (Karsch, 1888)
- Cydistomyia imitans Oldroyd, 1949
- Cydistomyia immatura Oldroyd, 1949
- Cydistomyia immigrans Oldroyd, 1949
- Cydistomyia improcerus Mackerras & Spratt, 2008
- Cydistomyia indiana Philip, 1970
- Cydistomyia infirmus Mackerras & Spratt, 2008
- Cydistomyia ingridina Usher, 1965
- Cydistomyia innubilus Mackerras & Spratt, 2008
- Cydistomyia inopinata Oldroyd, 1949
- Cydistomyia insurgens (Walker, 1861)
- Cydistomyia jactum Oldroyd, 1949
- Cydistomyia kamialiensis Goodwin, 1999
- Cydistomyia koroyanituensis Burger, 2006
- Cydistomyia kraussi Burger, 1995
- Cydistomyia laeta (Meijere, 1906)
- Cydistomyia lamellata Oldroyd, 1949
- Cydistomyia laticallosa (Ricardo, 1914)
- Cydistomyia latisegmentata (Schuurmans Stekhoven, 1926)
- Cydistomyia latistriata (Schuurmans Stekhoven, 1926)
- Cydistomyia lifuensis (Bigot, 1892)
- Cydistomyia limbatella (Bezzi, 1928)
- Cydistomyia longicornis Burger, 1995
- Cydistomyia longipennis Burger, 1995
- Cydistomyia longirostris (Schuurmans Stekhoven, 1926)
- Cydistomyia longistyla Burger, 1995
- Cydistomyia lorentzi (Ricardo, 1913)
- Cydistomyia macmilani Mackerras, 1964
- Cydistomyia magnetica (Ferguson & Hill, 1922)
- Cydistomyia major Oldroyd, 1964
- Cydistomyia massali Mackerras & Rageau, 1958
- Cydistomyia matilei Trojan, 1991
- Cydistomyia medialis (Oldroyd, 1954)
- Cydistomyia metallica Burger, 1995
- Cydistomyia minor (Oldroyd, 1954)
- Cydistomyia minor (Oldroyd, 1957)
- Cydistomyia minuta Burger, 1995
- Cydistomyia misol Philip, 1959
- Cydistomyia monteithi Mackerras & Spratt, 2008
- Cydistomyia mouchai Philip, 1970
- Cydistomyia musgravii (Taylor, 1918)
- Cydistomyia nana (Wiedemann, 1821)
- Cydistomyia nannoides Mackerras, 1971
- Cydistomyia nigrina Mackerras, 1971
- Cydistomyia nigropicta (Macquart, 1855)
- Cydistomyia nokensis Oldroyd, 1949
- Cydistomyia norae Trojan, 1991
- Cydistomyia obscurus Mackerras & Spratt, 2008
- Cydistomyia oldroydi Mackerras, 1964
- Cydistomyia pacifica (Ricardo, 1917)
- Cydistomyia palmensis (Ferguson & Hill, 1922)
- Cydistomyia papouina (Walker, 1865)
- Cydistomyia parapacifica Mackerras, 1971
- Cydistomyia parasol Philip, 1959
- Cydistomyia perdita Mackerras, 1964
- Cydistomyia philipi Burger, 1982
- Cydistomyia pilipennis Burger, 1982
- Cydistomyia pilosus Mackerras & Spratt, 2008
- Cydistomyia pinensis Burger, 1995
- Cydistomyia platybasiannulata (Schuurmans Stekhoven, 1926)
- Cydistomyia polyzona (Szilády, 1926)
- Cydistomyia pondo (Oldroyd, 1954)
- Cydistomyia primitiva Mackerras, 1962
- Cydistomyia pruina Mackerras & Spratt, 2008
- Cydistomyia pseudimmatura Oldroyd, 1949
- Cydistomyia pseudoardens (Taylor, 1913)
- Cydistomyia pseudobrevior Mackerras & Spratt, 2008
- Cydistomyia quadrimaculata Burger, 1995
- Cydistomyia quasimmatura Mackerras, 1964
- Cydistomyia risbeci Mackerras & Rageau, 1958
- Cydistomyia rivularis (Ferguson & Hill, 1922)
- Cydistomyia rosselensis Mackerras, 1971
- Cydistomyia roubaudi Mackerras & Rageau, 1958
- Cydistomyia sabulosus Mackerras & Spratt, 2008
- Cydistomyia secunda Mackerras, 1962
- Cydistomyia shaka Usher, 1970
- Cydistomyia silviformis (Taylor, 1919)
- Cydistomyia similis Mackerras, 1964
- Cydistomyia sol (Schuurmans Stekhoven, 1926)
- Cydistomyia solomensis (Ricardo, 1915)
- Cydistomyia sulcipalpus (Loew, 1858)
- Cydistomyia sylvioides (Walker, 1864)
- Cydistomyia tasmaniensis Mackerras & Spratt, 2008
- Cydistomyia teloides Mackerras, 1971
- Cydistomyia tibialis Burger, 1982
- Cydistomyia tiwackai Trojan, 1991
- Cydistomyia torresi (Ferguson & Hill, 1922)
- Cydistomyia toumanoffi Mackerras & Rageau, 1958
- Cydistomyia triangularis Mackerras & Spratt, 2008
- Cydistomyia victoriensis (Ricardo, 1915)
- Cydistomyia wentworthi (Ferguson & Hill, 1922)
- Cydistomyia zimbiti Usher, 1970
