= Oreoleptidae =

Scientific classification
- Kingdom: Animalia
- Phylum: Arthropoda
- Class: Insecta
- Order: Diptera
- Superfamily: Tabanoidea
- Family: Oreoleptidae; Zloty, Sinclair & Pritchard, 2005
- Genus: Oreoleptus; Zloty, Sinclair & Pritchard, 2005
- Species: O. torrenticola

Binomial name
- Oreoleptus torrenticola Zloty, Sinclair & Pritchard, 2005

Family of flies

Oreoleptidae is a family of flies (insects in the order Diptera). The family was established in 2005 on the basis of the type species Oreoleptis torrenticola placed in the monotypic genus Oreoleptis. The only known species was collected from the Rocky Mountains where the larvae grow in torrential streams. Larvae have also been found in groundwater wells. The larvae are similar to those of Athericidae and Tabanidae but with long crocheted false-legs (prolegs) arising from abdominal segments 2-7. The larvae have hollow mandibular hooks.

The aberrant larvae had been collected in the past in the United States and considered as athericids, but entomologists had been unable to identify the adult stage until 2005 when adults were reared from larvae. The adults were found very similar to Pelecorhynchidae when identifying using the key in McAlpine's 1981 Manual of Nearctic Diptera, but they stand apart due to the aedeagal tines and other male reproductive parts which indicate a clear similarity to the Athericidae and Tabanidae. The adults are dull grey with stylate antennae. The wing has cell r1 open.

The name is said to be derived from Greek oreos (mountain) and leptos (thin, delicate). The proper word for "mountain" is oros (ὄρος) in ancient Greek.
