= Betrequia =

Scientific classification
- Kingdom: Animalia
- Phylum: Arthropoda
- Class: Insecta
- Order: Diptera
- Family: Tabanidae
- Subfamily: Chrysopsinae
- Tribe: Rhinomyzini
- Genus: Betrequia; Oldroyd, 1970

Type species
- Betrequia ocellata Oldroyd, 1970

Genus of insects

Betrequia is a genus of horse flies in the family Tabanidae.

== Distribution ==
Brazil.

== Species ==
- Betrequia ocellata Oldroyd, 1970
