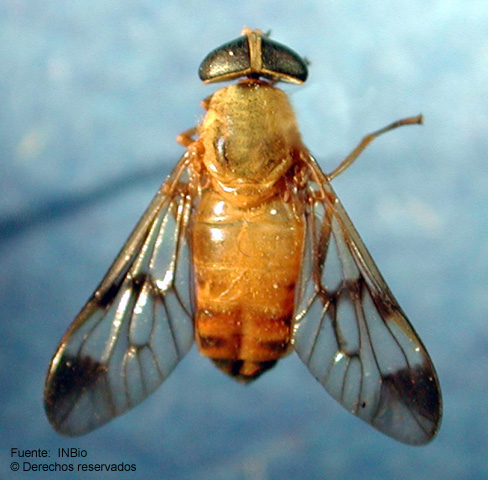
- Diachlorus ferrugatus from Costa Rica

Scientific classification
- Kingdom: Animalia
- Phylum: Arthropoda
- Class: Insecta
- Order: Diptera
- Family: Tabanidae
- Subfamily: Tabaninae
- Tribe: Diachlorini
- Genus: Diachlorus; Osten Sacken, 1876

Type species
- Tabanus bicinctus Fabricius, 1805

Synonyms
- Diabasis Macquart, 1834

= Diachlorus =

Genus of flies

Diachlorus is a genus of biting horseflies of the family Tabanidae. D. ferrugatus ranges from the southeastern United States to Costa Rica. There are 27 species with a neotropical distribution, with the greatest diversity in Brazil, while 3 are found in Central America.

== Species ==
- Diachlorus afflictus (Wiedemann, 1828)
- Diachlorus aitkeni Fairchild, 1972
- Diachlorus altivagus Lutz, 1913
- Diachlorus anduzei Stone, 1944
- Diachlorus bicinctus (Fabricius, 1805)
- Diachlorus bimaculatus (Wiedemann, 1828)
- Diachlorus bivittatus (Wiedemann, 1828)
- Diachlorus curvipes (Fabricius, 1805)
- Diachlorus distinctus Lutz, 1913
- Diachlorus fairchildi Henriques & Rafael, 1999
- Diachlorus falsifuscistigma Henriques & Rafael, 1999
- Diachlorus fascipennis Lutz, 1913
- Diachlorus ferrugatus (Fabricius, 1805)
- Diachlorus flavitaenia Lutz, 1913
- Diachlorus fuscistigma Lutz, 1913
- Diachlorus glaber (Wiedemann, 1828)
- Diachlorus habecki Wilkerson & Fairchild, 1982
- Diachlorus heppneri Wilkerson & Fairchild, 1982
- Diachlorus immaculatus (Wiedemann, 1828)
- Diachlorus jobbinsi Fairchild, 1942
- Diachlorus leticia Wilkerson & Fairchild, 1982
- Diachlorus leucotibialis Wilkerson & Fairchild, 1982
- Diachlorus neivai Lutz, 1913
- Diachlorus nuneztovari Fairchild & Ortiz, 1955
- Diachlorus pechumani Fairchild, 1972
- Diachlorus podagricus (Fabricius, 1805)
- Diachlorus scutellatus (Macquart, 1838)
- Diachlorus tenuimaculatus Henriques & Krolow, 2020
- Diachlorus trevori Wilkerson & Fairchild, 1982
- Diachlorus varipes (Rondani, 1848)
- Diachlorus xynus Fairchild, 1972
