= Eutabanus =

Scientific classification
- Kingdom: Animalia
- Phylum: Arthropoda
- Clade: Pancrustacea
- Class: Insecta
- Order: Diptera
- Family: Tabanidae
- Subfamily: Tabaninae
- Tribe: Diachlorini
- Genus: Eutabanus; Kröber, 1930

Type species
- Eutabanus pictus Kröber, 1930

Genus of insects

Eutabanus is a genus of biting horseflies of the family Tabanidae.

== Distribution ==
Peru, Brazil.

== Species ==
- Eutabanus pictus Kröber, 1930
