= Microtabanus =

Scientific classification
- Kingdom: Animalia
- Phylum: Arthropoda
- Class: Insecta
- Order: Diptera
- Family: Tabanidae
- Subfamily: Tabaninae
- Tribe: Diachlorini
- Genus: Microtabanus; Fairchild, 1937

Type species
- Tabanus pygmaeus Williston, 1887

Synonyms
- Microtabanus Lutz, 1922

Genus of flies

Microtabanus is a genus of horse flies in the family Tabanidae. There is at least one described species in Microtabanus, M. pygmaeus.
