= Pseudacanthocera =

Scientific classification
- Kingdom: Animalia
- Phylum: Arthropoda
- Class: Insecta
- Order: Diptera
- Family: Tabanidae
- Subfamily: Tabaninae
- Tribe: Diachlorini
- Genus: Pseudacanthocera; Lutz, 1909

Type species
- Silvius sylveirii Macquart, 1838

Genus of flies

Pseudacanthocera is a genus of horse flies in the family Tabanidae.

== Species ==
- Pseudacanthocera brevicorne Enderlein, 1925
- Pseudacanthocera fraterna Kröber, 1930
- Pseudacanthocera paralellifrons Kröber, 1929
- Pseudacanthocera sylveirii (Macquart, 1838)
