= Atelozella =

Scientific classification
- Kingdom: Animalia
- Phylum: Arthropoda
- Class: Insecta
- Order: Diptera
- Family: Tabanidae
- Subfamily: Tabaninae
- Tribe: Diachlorini
- Genus: Atelozella; Bequaert, 1930

Type species
- Atelozella Ateloza Enderlein, 1923

Synonyms
- Ateloza Enderlein, 1923

Genus of flies

Atelozella is a genus of horse flies in the family Tabanidae.

== Species ==
- Atelozella fuelleborni (Enderlein, 1923)
- Atelozella subulata Oldroyd, 1957)
