= Phaeotabanus =

Scientific classification
- Kingdom: Animalia
- Phylum: Arthropoda
- Clade: Pancrustacea
- Class: Insecta
- Order: Diptera
- Family: Tabanidae
- Subfamily: Tabaninae
- Tribe: Diachlorini
- Genus: Phaeotabanus; Lutz, 1913

Type species
- Tabanus litigiosus Walker, 1850

Genus of flies

Phaeotabanus is a genus of horse flies in the family Tabanidae.

== Species ==
- Phaeotabanus aphanopterus (Wiedemann, 1828)
- Phaeotabanus atopus (Fairchild, 1953)
- Phaeotabanus cajennensis (Fabricius, 1787)
- Phaeotabanus dissimilis Barretto, 1950)
- Phaeotabanus fervens (Linnaeus, 1758)
- Phaeotabanus innotescens (Walker, 1854)
- Phaeotabanus insolens (Fairchild, 1958)
- Phaeotabanus limpidapex (Wiedemann, 1828)
- Phaeotabanus litigiosus (Walker, 1850)
- Phaeotabanus longiappendiculatus (Macquart, 1855)
- Phaeotabanus nigriflavus (Kröber, 1930)
- Phaeotabanus obscurehirtus Kröber, 1930)
- Phaeotabanus obscurepilis Kröber, 1934)
- Phaeotabanus phaeopterus Fairchild, 1964)
- Phaeotabanus prasiniventris (Kröber, 1929)
- Philipotabanus magnificus (Kröber, 1934)
