= Chalybosoma =

Scientific classification
- Kingdom: Animalia
- Phylum: Arthropoda
- Class: Insecta
- Order: Diptera
- Family: Tabanidae
- Subfamily: Tabaninae
- Tribe: Diachlorini
- Genus: Chalybosoma; Oldroyd, 1949

Type species
- Tabanus metallicum Ricardo, 1913

Genus of flies

Chalybosoma is a genus of horse flies in the family Tabanidae.

== Species ==
- Chalybosoma luciliaeforme (Schuurmans Stekhoven, 1926)
- Chalybosoma malkini Oldroyd, 1949
- Chalybosoma metallicum (Ricardo, 1913)
