= Hippocentrodes =

Scientific classification
- Kingdom: Animalia
- Phylum: Arthropoda
- Class: Insecta
- Order: Diptera
- Family: Tabanidae
- Subfamily: Tabaninae
- Tribe: Haematopotini
- Genus: Hippocentrodes; Philip, 1961

Type species
- Hippocentrodes desmotes Philip, 1961

Genus of flies

Hippocentrodes is a genus of horse flies in the family Tabanidae.

== Species ==
- Hippocentrodes desmotes Philip, 1961
- Hippocentrodes striatipennis (Brunetti, 1912)
