= Rhabdotylus =

Scientific classification
- Kingdom: Animalia
- Phylum: Arthropoda
- Class: Insecta
- Order: Diptera
- Family: Tabanidae
- Subfamily: Tabaninae
- Tribe: Diachlorini
- Genus: Rhabdotylus; Lutz, 1909

Type species
- Tabanus planiventris Wiedemann, 1828

Synonyms
- Gymnochela Enderlein, 1925

Genus of flies

Rhabdotylus is a genus of horse flies in the family Tabanidae.

== Species ==
- Rhabdotylus ruber (Thunberg, 1827)
- Rhabdotylus venenatum (Osten Sacken, 1886)
- Rhabdotylus viridiventre (Macquart, 1838)
