= Neobolbodimyia =

Scientific classification
- Kingdom: Animalia
- Phylum: Arthropoda
- Class: Insecta
- Order: Diptera
- Family: Tabanidae
- Subfamily: Tabaninae
- Tribe: Diachlorini
- Genus: Neobolbodimyia; Ricardo, 1913

Type species
- Neobolbodimyia nigra Ricardo, 1913

Genus of flies

Neobolbodimyia is a genus of horse flies in the family Tabanidae.

== Species ==
- Neobolbodimyia nigra Ricardo, 1913
