= Atelozomyia =

Scientific classification
- Kingdom: Animalia
- Phylum: Arthropoda
- Clade: Pancrustacea
- Class: Insecta
- Order: Diptera
- Family: Tabanidae
- Subfamily: Tabaninae
- Tribe: Diachlorini
- Genus: Atelozomyia; Dias, 1987

Type species
- Atelozomyia thalassae Dias, 1987

Genus of flies

Atelozomyia is a genus of horse flies in the family Tabanidae.

== Distribution ==
Horse flies of the genus Atelozomyia are found in Namibia.

== Species ==
- Atelozomyia thalassae Dias, 1987
