= Selasoma =

Scientific classification
- Kingdom: Animalia
- Phylum: Arthropoda
- Class: Insecta
- Order: Diptera
- Family: Tabanidae
- Subfamily: Tabaninae
- Tribe: Diachlorini
- Genus: Selasoma; Macquart, 1838

Type species
- Tabanus tibialis Fabricius, 1805

Genus of flies

Selasoma is a genus of horse flies in the family Tabanidae.

== Distribution ==
Mexico, Argentina, Trinidad.

== Species ==
- Selasoma tibiale (Fabricius, 1805)
