= Himantostylus =

Scientific classification
- Kingdom: Animalia
- Phylum: Arthropoda
- Class: Insecta
- Order: Diptera
- Family: Tabanidae
- Subfamily: Tabaninae
- Tribe: Diachlorini
- Genus: Himantostylus; Lutz, 1913

Type species
- Himantostylus intermedius Lutz, 1913

Genus of flies

Himantostylus is a genus of horse flies in the family Tabanidae.

== Distribution ==
Panama to Bolivia.

== Species ==
- Himantostylus intermedius Lutz, 1913
