= Nanorrhynchus =

Scientific classification
- Kingdom: Animalia
- Phylum: Arthropoda
- Class: Insecta
- Order: Diptera
- Family: Tabanidae
- Subfamily: Tabaninae
- Tribe: Diachlorini
- Genus: Nanorrhynchus; Olsoufiev, 1937

Type species
- Atylotus crassinervis Villeneuve, 1925

Genus of flies

Nanorrhynchus is a genus of horse flies in the family Tabanidae.

== Distribution ==
Turkmenistan, Uzbekistan, Kazakhstan.

== Species ==
- Nanorrhynchus crassinervis (Villeneuve, 1925)
