= Bartolomeudiasiella =

Scientific classification
- Kingdom: Animalia
- Phylum: Arthropoda
- Class: Insecta
- Order: Diptera
- Family: Tabanidae
- Subfamily: Tabaninae
- Tribe: Diachlorini
- Genus: Bartolomeudiasiella; Dias, 1987

Type species
- Bartolomeudiasiella atlanticus Dias, 1987

Genus of flies

Bartolomeudiasiella is a genus of horse flies in the family Tabanidae.

== Distribution ==
Namibia.

== Species ==
- Bartolomeudiasiella atlanticus Dias, 1987
