= Roquezia =

Scientific classification
- Kingdom: Animalia
- Phylum: Arthropoda
- Class: Insecta
- Order: Diptera
- Family: Tabanidae
- Subfamily: Tabaninae
- Tribe: Diachlorini
- Genus: Roquezia; Wilkerson, 1985

Type species
- Roquezia signifera Wilkerson, 1985

Genus of flies

Roquezia is a genus of horse flies in the family Tabanidae.

== Species ==
- Roquezia signifera (Wiedemann, 1821)
