= Montismyia =

Scientific classification
- Kingdom: Animalia
- Phylum: Arthropoda
- Class: Insecta
- Order: Diptera
- Family: Tabanidae
- Subfamily: Tabaninae
- Tribe: Diachlorini
- Genus: Montismyia; González, 2017

Type species
- Tabanus lautus Hine, 1920

Genus of flies

Montismyia is a genus of horse flies in the family Tabanidae.

== Species ==
- Montismyia lauta Hine, 1920
