= Cryptotylus =

Scientific classification
- Kingdom: Animalia
- Phylum: Arthropoda
- Class: Insecta
- Order: Diptera
- Family: Tabanidae
- Subfamily: Tabaninae
- Tribe: Diachlorini
- Genus: Cryptotylus; Lutz, 1909

Type species
- Tabanus unicolor Wiedemann, 1828

Synonyms
- Ommallia Enderlein, 1923

Genus of flies

Cryptotylus is a genus of horse flies in the family Tabanidae.

== Species ==
- Cryptotylus aeratus Philip & Fairchild, 1956
- Cryptotylus cauri Stone, 1944
- Cryptotylus chloroticus Philip & Fairchild, 1956
- Cryptotylus stonei Maldonado Capriles, 1955
- Cryptotylus unicolor (Wiedemann, 1828)
- Cryptotylus xikrin Gorayeb & Fairchild, 1985
