= Philipota =

Scientific classification
- Kingdom: Animalia
- Phylum: Arthropoda
- Class: Insecta
- Order: Diptera
- Family: Tabanidae
- Subfamily: Tabaninae
- Tribe: Diachlorini
- Genus: Philipota; Kapoor, 1991

Type species
- Philipota kanpurensis Kapoor, 1991

Genus of flies

Philipota is a genus of horse flies in the family Tabanidae.

== Species ==
- Philipota kanpurensis Kapoor, Grewal & Sharma, 1991
- Philipota ludhianaensis Kapoor, Grewal & Sharma, 1991

== Distribution ==
India
