= Pachyschelomyia =

Scientific classification
- Kingdom: Animalia
- Phylum: Arthropoda
- Class: Insecta
- Order: Diptera
- Family: Tabanidae
- Subfamily: Tabaninae
- Tribe: Diachlorini
- Genus: Pachyschelomyia; Barretto, 1950

Type species
- Pachyschelomyia notopleuralis Barretto, 1950

Genus of flies

Pachyschelomyia is a genus of horse flies in the family Tabanidae.

== Species ==
- Pachyschelomyia notopleuralis Barretto, 1950
