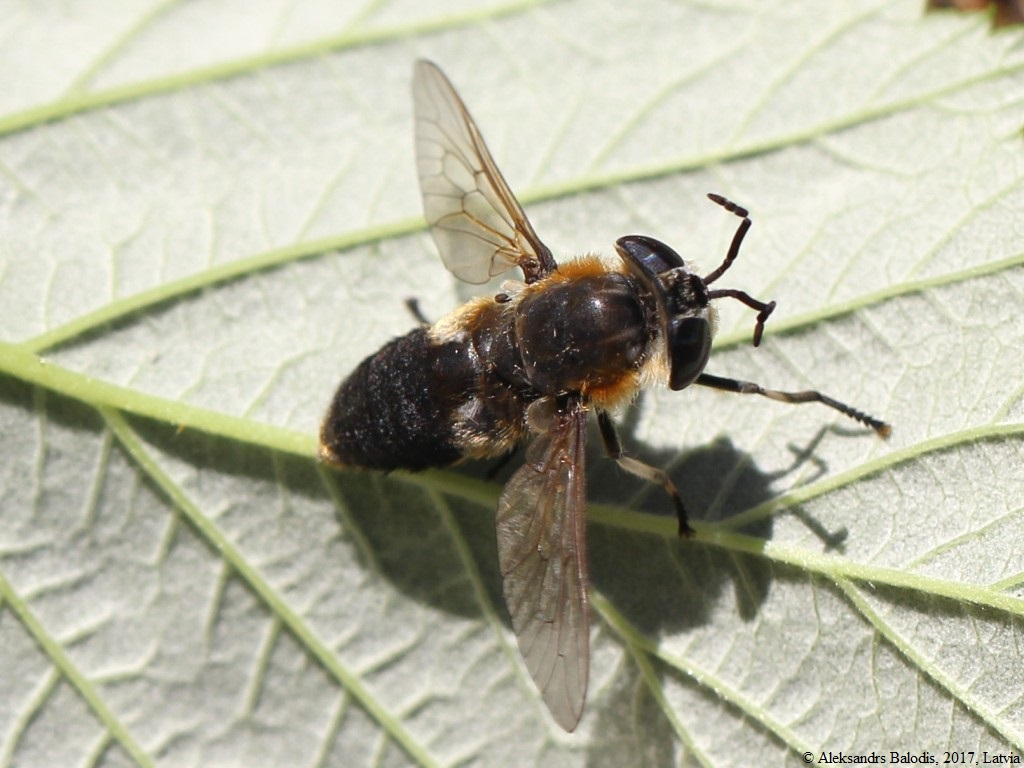

Scientific classification
- Kingdom: Animalia
- Phylum: Arthropoda
- Class: Insecta
- Order: Diptera
- Family: Tabanidae
- Subfamily: Tabaninae
- Tribe: Haematopotini
- Genus: Heptatoma; Meigen, 1803

= Heptatoma =

Genus of flies

Heptatoma is a genus of European flies belonging to the subfamily Tabaninae.

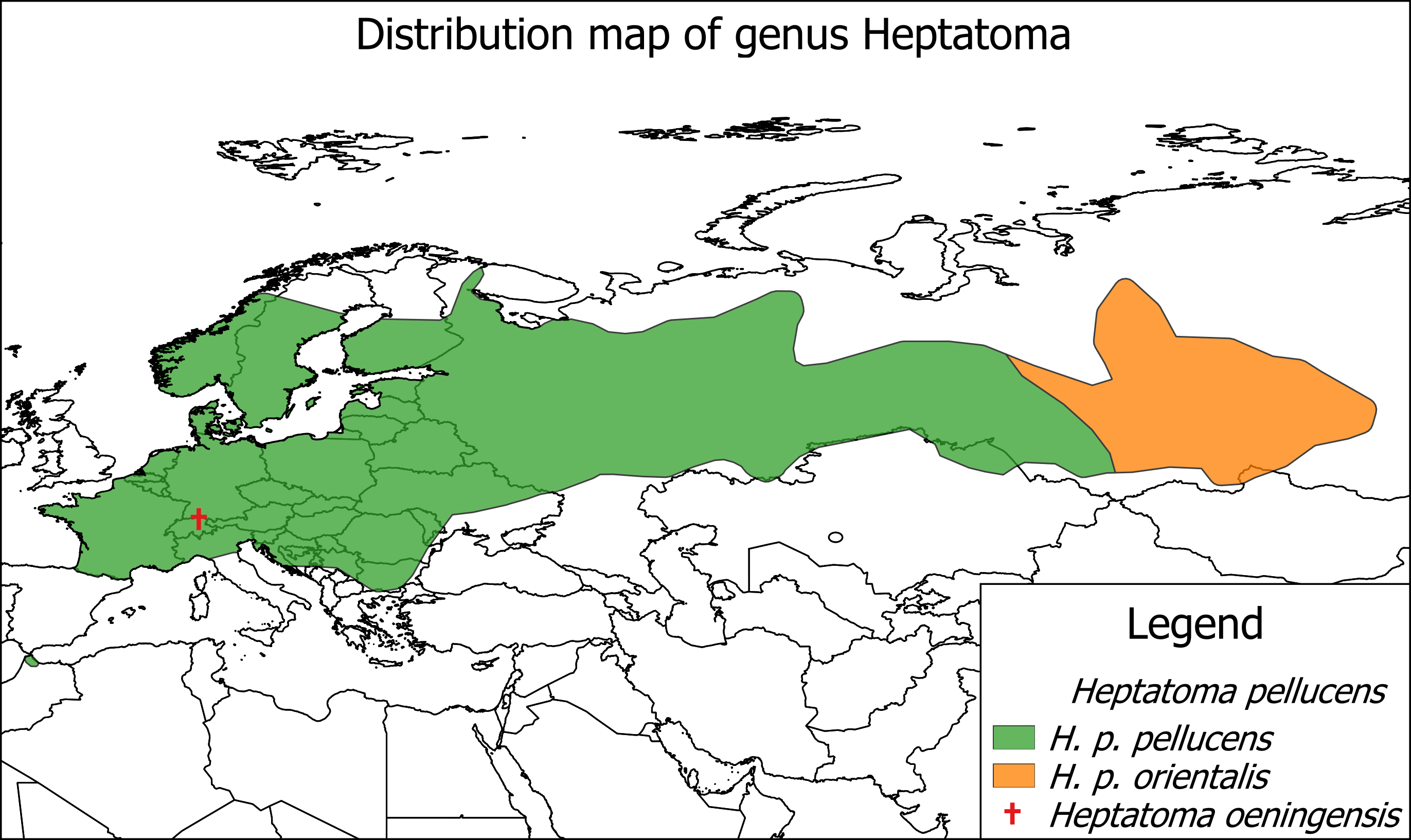
recorded distribution of Heptatoma

This is effectively a monotypic genus, containing the extant species Heptatoma pellucens (Fabricius, 1776): of which there are two subspecies (as shown above). The locality of the extinct species †Heptatoma oeningensis (Heer, 1865) is also shown.

== Species ==
- Heptatoma oeningensis (Heer, 1864)
- Heptatoma pellucens (Fabricius, 1777)
