= Holcopsis =

Scientific classification
- Kingdom: Animalia
- Phylum: Arthropoda
- Clade: Pancrustacea
- Class: Insecta
- Order: Diptera
- Family: Tabanidae
- Subfamily: Tabaninae
- Tribe: Diachlorini
- Genus: Holcopsis; Enderlein, 1923

Type species
- Holcopsis fenestrata Enderlein, 1923

Genus of flies

Holcopsis is a genus of horse flies in the family Tabanidae.

== Species ==
- Holcopsis bequaerti (Philip, 1943)
- Holcopsis bifenestrata (Osten Sacken, 1886)
- Holcopsis fenestrata Enderlein, 1923
- Holcopsis pilifera (Philip, 1943)
