= Erioneura =

Scientific classification
- Kingdom: Animalia
- Phylum: Arthropoda
- Class: Insecta
- Order: Diptera
- Family: Tabanidae
- Subfamily: Tabaninae
- Tribe: Diachlorini
- Genus: Erioneura; Barretto, 1950

Type species
- Tabanus fuscipennis Wiedemann, 1828

Genus of insects

Erioneura is a genus of biting horseflies of the family Tabanidae.

== Distribution ==
Brazil.

== Species ==
- Erioneura fuscipennis (Wiedemann, 1828)
