= Whitneyomyia =

Scientific classification
- Kingdom: Animalia
- Phylum: Arthropoda
- Class: Insecta
- Order: Diptera
- Family: Tabanidae
- Subfamily: Tabaninae
- Tribe: Tabanini
- Genus: Whitneyomyia; Bequaert, 1933
- Species: W. beatifica

Binomial name
- Whitneyomyia beatifica (Whitney, 1914)

Synonyms
- Snowiellus stygius Enderlein, 1925; Tabanus ater Palisot de Beauvois, 1811; Tabanus beatifica Whitney, 1914; Tabanus lugubris Macquart, 1838

Genus of insects

Whitneyomyia is a genus of horse flies in the family Tabanidae. There is at least one described species in Whitneyomyia, W. beatifica.
