= Buestanmyia =

Scientific classification
- Kingdom: Animalia
- Phylum: Arthropoda
- Class: Insecta
- Order: Diptera
- Family: Tabanidae
- Subfamily: Tabaninae
- Tribe: Diachlorini
- Genus: Buestanmyia; González, 2021

Type species
- Buestanmyia chiriboga González, 2021

Genus of flies

Buestanmyia is a genus of horse flies in the family Tabanidae.

== Distribution ==
Ecuador.

== Species ==
- Buestanmyia chiriboga González, 2021
