= Myiotabanus =

Scientific classification
- Kingdom: Animalia
- Phylum: Arthropoda
- Class: Insecta
- Order: Diptera
- Family: Tabanidae
- Subfamily: Tabaninae
- Tribe: Diachlorini
- Genus: Myiotabanus; Lutz, 1928

Type species
- Myiotabanus sarcophagoides Lutz, 1928

Genus of flies

Myiotabanus is a genus of horse flies in the family Tabanidae.

== Species ==
- Myiotabanus amazonicus Rafael & Ferreira, 2004
- Myiotabanus muscoideus Hine, 1907
- Myiotabanus sarcophagoides Lutz, 1928
