= Teskeyellus =

Scientific classification
- Kingdom: Animalia
- Phylum: Arthropoda
- Class: Insecta
- Order: Diptera
- Family: Tabanidae
- Subfamily: Tabaninae
- Tribe: Diachlorini
- Genus: Teskeyellus; Philip & Fairchild, 1974

Type species
- Teskeyellus hirsuticornis Philip & Fairchild, 1974

Genus of flies

Teskeyellus is a genus of horse flies in the family Tabanidae.

== Species ==
- Teskeyellus cyanommatus Henroques & Carmo, 2017
- Teskeyellus hirsuticornis Philip & Fairchild, 1974
