= Lissimas =

Scientific classification
- Kingdom: Animalia
- Phylum: Arthropoda
- Clade: Pancrustacea
- Class: Insecta
- Order: Diptera
- Family: Tabanidae
- Subfamily: Tabaninae
- Tribe: Diachlorini
- Genus: Lissimas; Enderlein, 1922

Type species
- Lissimas fenestratus Enderlein, 1922

Genus of insects

Lissimas is a genus of biting horseflies of the family Tabanidae.

== Species ==
- Lissimas australis (Ricardo, 1915)
- Lissimas fenestratus Enderlein, 1922
- Lissimas moestus Szilády, 1926
- Lissimas moluccensis Mackerras, 1964
- Lissimas papuensis Mackerras, 1971
- Lissimas parallelus (Walker, 1861)
- Lissimas pechumani Philip, 1959
- Lissimas philipi Mackerras, 1964
