= Oopelma =

Scientific classification
- Kingdom: Animalia
- Phylum: Arthropoda
- Class: Insecta
- Order: Diptera
- Family: Tabanidae
- Subfamily: Tabaninae
- Tribe: Diachlorini
- Genus: Oopelma; Enderlein, 1923

Type species
- Tabanus globicornis Wiedemann, 1821

Genus of flies

Oopelma is a genus of horse flies in the family Tabanidae.

== Species ==
- Oopelma globicorne (Wiedemann, 1821)
