= Elephantotus =

Scientific classification
- Kingdom: Animalia
- Phylum: Arthropoda
- Class: Insecta
- Order: Diptera
- Family: Tabanidae
- Subfamily: Tabaninae
- Tribe: Diachlorini
- Genus: Elephantotus; Gorayeb, 2014

Type species
- Elephantotus tracuateuensis Gorayeb, 2014

Genus of flies

Elephantotus is a genus of horse flies in the family Tabanidae. Inocêncio de S. Gorayeb was the author of this taxon's scientific name, published in 2014.

== Species ==
- Elephantotus tracuateuensis Gorayeb, 2014
