= Anaerythrops =

Scientific classification
- Kingdom: Animalia
- Phylum: Arthropoda
- Clade: Pancrustacea
- Class: Insecta
- Order: Diptera
- Family: Tabanidae
- Subfamily: Tabaninae
- Tribe: Diachlorini
- Genus: Anaerythrops; Barretto, 1948

Type species
- Anaerythrops lanei Barretto, 1948

Genus of flies

Anaerythrops is a genus of horse flies in the family Tabanidae.

== Species ==
- Anaerythrops lanei Barretto, 1948
- Anaerythrops philipi Barretto, 1948
