= Ernest Edward Austen =

British entomologist

Ernest Edward Austen DSO (1867 in London – 16 January 1938) was an English entomologist specialising in Diptera and Hymenoptera.

His collection of Amazonian and Sierra Leonian insects is in the Natural History Museum, London.

He wrote Illustrations of British Blood-Sucking Flies (1906) illustrated by Amedeo John Engel Terzi.

Austen was a frequent correspondent of Ethel Katharine Pearce, dipterologist, daughter of Thomas and granddaughter of Charles Henry Blake.

== Patronymic taxa ==
Taxa named for Austen include:

- Glossina austeni
