= Harold Oldroyd =

British entomologist (1913–1978)

Harold Oldroyd (24 December 1913 – 3 September 1978) was a British entomologist. He specialised in the biology of flies, and wrote many books, especially popular science that helped entomology to reach a broader public. His The Natural History of Flies is considered to be the "fly Bible". Although his speciality was the Diptera, he acknowledged that they are not a popular topic: "Breeding in dung, carrion, sewage and even living flesh, flies are a subject of disgust...not to be discussed in polite society". It was Oldroyd who proposed the idea of hyphenating the names of true flies (Diptera) to distinguish them from other insects with "fly" in their names. Thus, the "house-fly", "crane-fly" and "blow-fly" would be true flies, while the "dragonfly", "scorpion fly" and so on belong to other orders. He also debunked the calculation that a single pair of house-flies, if allowed to reproduce without inhibitions could, within nine months, number 5.6 trillion individuals, enough to cover the Earth to a thickness of 14.3 m (47 ft). Oldroyd calculated that such a layer would only cover Germany, but remarked "that is still a lot of flies".

All the following lists are potentially incomplete. Please add to them if you know of more.

== Papers by Oldroyd ==
- Cookson H. A., and Oldroyd H. 1937: Intestinal infestation by larvae of a drone fly. Lancet 2: 804.
- Oldroyd, H. 1940: The genus Hoplistomerus Macquart (Diptera: Asilidae). 5 figs., 12 pp. Trans. R. ent. Soc. Lond.
- Oldroyd, H. 1947a: Results of Armstrong College expedition to Siwa Oasis (Libyan desert), 1935. - Bulletin de la Société Fouad Ier d'Entomologie 31: 113–120, Kairo.
- Oldroyd, H. 1947b: The Diptera of the Territory of New Guinea. XIV. Family Tabanidae. Part II. Pangoniinae, except the genus Chrysops. Proc. Linn. Soc. N.S.W. 72: 125–42.
- Oldroyd, H. 1949a. A wingless empid (Diptera) from Tasmania. Entomol. Mon. Mag. 84: 278–79.
- Oldroyd, H. 1949b. The Diptera of the Territory of New Guinea. XIV. Family Tabanidae. Part III. Tabaninae. Proc. Linn. Soc. N.S.W. 73: 304–61.
- Oldroyd, H. 1952: A new Chrysops (Diptera, Tabanidae) from the British Cameroons. Ann Trop Med Parasitol. 1952 Sep;46(2):155-7.
- Oldroyd, H. 1952. The horseflies (Diptera: Tabanidae) of the Ethiopian Region. Volume I. Haematopota and Hippocentrum. British Museum (Natural History), London. ix + 226 pp.
- Oldroyd, H. 1954. The horseflies (Diptera: Tabanidae) of the Ethiopian Region. Volume II. Tabanus and related genera. British Museum (Natural History), London. x + 341 pp.
- Oldroyd, H. 1955. The Diptera of Auckland and Campbell islands. Part 4. A wingless dolichopodid (Diptera) from Campbell Island. Rec. Dominion Mus. 2: 243–46.
- Oldroyd, H. 1956. A new genus and species of Dolichopodidae (Diptera) from Malaya. Proc. R. Entomol. Soc. Lond. (B) 25: 210–11.
- Oldroyd, H. 1957: The horseflies (Diptera: Tabanidae) of the Ethiopian Region. Volume III. Subfamilies
- Oldroyd, H. 1958, Some Asilidae from Iran. Stuttg. Beitr. Naturk., No. 9:1–10
- Oldroyd, H. 1963: The Tribes and genera of the African Asilidae (Diptera). Stuttgarter Beiträge zur Naturkunde aus dem Staatlichen Museum für Naturkunde in Stuttgart. Nr. 107.
- Oldroyd, H. 1964: Diptera from Nepal. Asilidae. Bull. Br. Mus. (Nat. Hist.) Entomol. 15: 237–54.
- Oldroyd, H. 1969: The family Leptogastridae (Diptera). Proc. R. ent. Soc. Lond. (B) 38: 27–31.
- Oldroyd, H. 1970: Studies of African Asilidae (Diptera). Bulletin of the British Museum.
- Oldroyd, H. 1972. Robber flies (Diptera: Asilidae) of the Philippine Islands. Pac. Insects 14: 201–37.
- Oldroyd, H. 1972: Two robber flies (Diptera, Asilidae) of unusual structure. - Journal of Natural History 6: 635–642; London.
- Oldroyd, H. 1974. An introduction to the robber flies (Diptera: Asilidae) of South Africa. Annals of the Natal Museum 22: 1–171.

== Books by Oldroyd ==
- 1939: Edwards, Oldroyd and Smart: British Blood-sucking flies. 156 pp
- 1965: The Natural History of Flies. New York: W. W. Norton.
- 1968: Elements of entomology. Weidenfeld and Nicolson. ISBN 0-297-76453-5
- 1969: Handbook for the identification of British Insects. Diptera Brachycera. Sections Tabanoidea and Asiloidea. Royal Entomological Society of London. 132 pp.
- January 1970: Collecting, Preserving and Studying Insects (2nd edition). Hutchinson. ISBN 0-09-023663-7
- 1970: Elements of entomology: An introduction to the study of insects ([The Universe natural history]). Universe Books. ISBN 0-87663-127-8
- 1970: Diptera: Introduction and Key to Families. In the "Handbooks for the Identification of British Insects Series" (1970)
- June 1973: Insects and Their World. Paperback . Univ of Chicago Pr. ISBN 0-226-62636-9
- Insects and Their World. ISBN 0-565-05394-9. British Museum (Natural History).
- September 1976: Insects in Your Garden (Puffin Books). Paperback. Puffin Books. ISBN 0-14-030874-1
- date unknown: Ladybirds

== Book chapters by Oldroyd ==
- 1964 (O. Theodor and H. Oldroyd): Hippoboscidae. In Lindner, E. [Ed.]: Die Fliegen der paläarktischen Region - Stuttgart, 12: 1-70.
- 1973 (Oldroyd H, and Smith KGV): Diptera: Eggs and larvae of flies. In Smith KGV (ed.) Insects and other arthropods of medical importance. 1st ed. The trustees of the British Museum (Natural History) London, 1973; p. 289-323.
- 1975: Family Asilidae. In "A catalogue of the Diptera of the Oriental Region, Vol. II, Suborder Brachycera through Division Aschiza, Suborder Cyclorrhapha" (M.D. Delfinado and D.E. Hardy, eds.). University Press of Hawaii, Honolulu. 459 pp

== Translations by Oldroyd ==
- Insects In Flight : A Glimpse Behind The Scenes In Biophysical Research / by Werner Nachtigall; Translators: Harold Oldroyd, Roger H. Abbott [And] Marguerite Biederman-Thors 1974
- World Of An Insect by Remy Chauvin. Translated from the French. World Univ. Library/Mcgraw, New York, 1967, Trade Paperback, pp256.

== Taxa named by Oldroyd ==
Andrenosoma cornuta Oldroyd, 1972
Apterachalcus borboroides (Oldroyd, 1956)
Apterodromia Oldroyd
Betrequia ocellata Oldroyd
Dipseliopoda biannulata (Oldroyd, 1953)
Entisia tarsata Oldroyd, 1968
Heteropogon asiaticus Oldroyd, 1963
Lamyra greatheadi Oldroyd
Lamyra rossi Oldroyd
Melanothereva blackmani Oldroyd, 1968
Oxynoton arnaudi Oldroyd
Pachyrrhiza argentata Oldroyd, 1968
Stiphrolamyra rubicunda Oldroyd, 1947

== Taxa named after Oldroyd (not all are still valid) ==
Amblypsilopus oldroydi (Haider, 1957)
Gigantosciapus oldroydi Grichanov, 1997
Irwiniella oldroydi Lyneborg, 1976
Sciapus oldroydi Haider, 1957
