= Graham Fairchild =

American entomologist

- Born: Alexander Graham Bell Fairchild; August 17, 1906; Washington, D.C.
- Died: February 10, 1994 (aged 87); Gainesville, Florida
- Education: Harvard University
- Occupation: Entomologist
- Spouse: Elva Russell Whitman (m. 1938)
- Children: 2
- Parent(s): David Fairchild; Marian Hubbard Bell
- Relatives: Alexander Graham Bell (grandfather)

Alexander Graham Bell Fairchild (August 17, 1906 – February 10, 1994) was an American entomologist, and a member of the Fairchild family, descendants of Thomas Fairchild of Stratford, Connecticut and one of two grandsons of the scientist and inventor, Alexander Graham Bell, for whom he was named, and son of David Fairchild, a botanist and plant explorer.

== Early life ==
Alexander ("Sandy" to his friends and family) was born in 1906 in Washington, D.C. Like most entomologists, Fairchild began his lifelong love affair with insects by collecting butterflies in the fields and barns where he lived. At the age of 15, now an avid butterfly collector, young Fairchild was first introduced to the intensely fecund, immensely complex world of the American ("New World") tropical forests by his father, who was helping with starting the Barro Colorado Tropical Research Station in Panama. After a long canoe ride up the Chagres River in Panama, he became permanently hooked on the tropics. After a number of magical years travelling with his plant collector father to the jungles of Sri Lanka, Sumatra, and Indonesia, Sandy reluctantly finished high school at age 20, to then attend Harvard, graduating in 1931, in the depths of the Great Depression.

== Career ==
With few to no jobs available, Sandy began working toward a Ph.D. in biology at Harvard. Encouraged by his faculty advisor, Professor Joseph Bequaert, Fairchild chose the Tabanidae, a family of insects known as "horse flies". Tabanids are worldwide, numerous, and taxonomically complex. Since some feed on humans and thus may carry diseases, Fairchild realized this specialty could get him a job in the tropics. Since he first fell in love with the tropics in Panama, he wrote his thesis, naturally, on the Tabanidae of Panama.

After a year in Northwest Brazil, studying mosquitos with the Rockefeller Foundation he landed his dream job in Panama at the Gorgas Memorial Laboratory now known as the Instituto Conmemorativo Gorgas de Estudios de la Salud. At 32, he moved to Panama with his bride Elva Russell Whitman of Boston, to there raise a family and research biting insects and ticks deemed threatening to the thousands of Americans living at the time in the Panama Canal Zone. He eventually became Assistant, then Acting Director of that research facility in Tropical medicine, funded both by Congress and the Republic of Panamá. He published his research on taxonomy and epidemiology, in over 130 scientific papers and books. In recognition of his 32 years of work on Panamanian insects, in 1978 the Universidad de Panamá named their new Invertebrate Museum in his honor.

After retiring, Sandy and his wife Elva (whom he married in 1938) moved to Gainesville, Florida, where for the next 25 years, he continued to publish papers and advise graduate students and fellow scientists around the world. In retirement and without pay, he organized the collections of Neotropical Tabanidae at the University of Florida and later at the Florida State Collection of Arthropods. Among the numerous honors he was given during his lifetime, he was proudest of having been named by the American Entomological Society as Entomologist of the Year.

Sandy continued working up until a week before he died, at the age of 87. At last count, over 33 species of insects have been named after him by other entomologists.
