= Otto Kröber =

German entomologist (1882–1969)

Otto Kröber (22 May 1882 in Hamburg – 5 January 1969) was a German entomologist specialising in Diptera. He worked mainly on Tabanidae, Omphralidae, Therevidae and Conopidae.

Kröber was a professor in the Zoological Museum in Hamburg (now Zoologisches Institut und Zoologisches Museum, Universitat von Hamburg, Hamburg, Germany).

== Works ==
Selected

- Kröber, Otto (1911). "Die Thereviden Süd und Mittelamerikas". Annales Musei Nationalis Hungarici (in German). IX. Budapest: 475–529.
- Kröber, Otto (1912). "Die Thereviden der indo-australischen Region" (PDF). Entomol. Mitteilungen (in German). I (8): 242–256. Archived (PDF) from the original on 20 March 2019.
- Therevidae.Genera.Ins. (1913).
- Kröber, Otto (1914). "Beiträge zur Kenntnis der Thereviden und Omphraliden". Jahrbuch der Hamburgischen Wissenschaftlichen Anstalten (in German). XXXI (1913). Hamburg: 29–74.
- Kröber, Otto (1924–1925). Lindner, Erwin (ed.). Die Fliegen Der Palaearktischen Region. 26. Therevidae. (in German). Vol. IV. Stuggart: Schweizerbart'sche. pp. 1–60. ISBN 9783510430185.
- Kröber, Otto (1928). "Neue und wenig bekannte Dipteren aus den Familien Omphralidae, Conopidae und Therevidae". Konowia Zeitschrift für Systematische Insektenkunde (in German). VII (1): 113–134.
- Kröber, Otto (1931). "The Therevidae (Diptera) of South Africa". Annals of the Transvaal Museum. 14: 103–134.

== Collections ==
National Museum of Natural History via J. M. Aldrich Washington; Muséum national d'histoire naturelle via J. Surcouf and Staatliches Museum für Tierkunde Dresden
