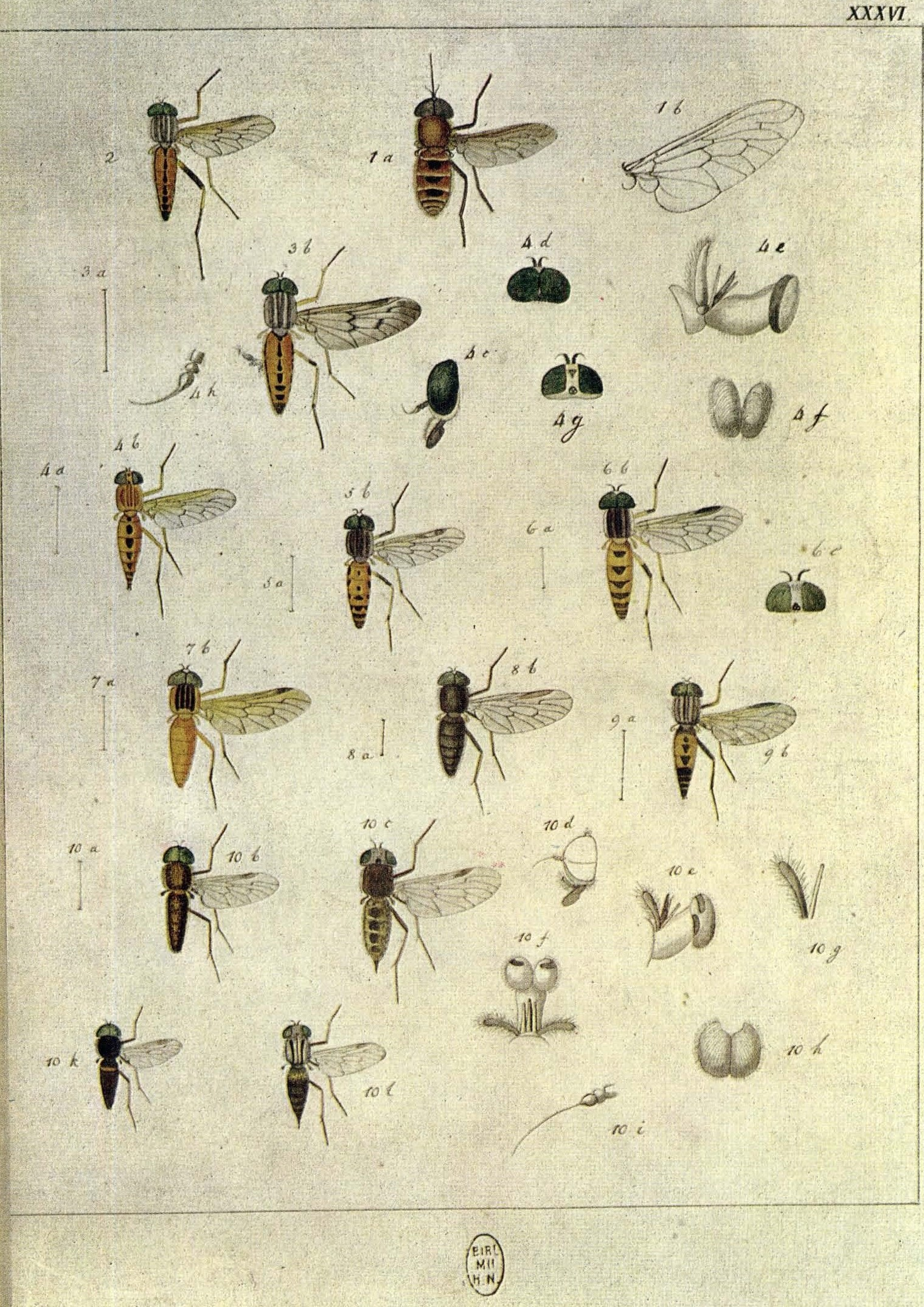
- Pangonia ferruginea Macquart, 1838 in Johann Wilhelm Meigen Europäischen Zweiflügeligen Figure 1, 1a

Scientific classification
- Kingdom: Animalia
- Phylum: Arthropoda
- Class: Insecta
- Order: Diptera
- Family: Tabanidae
- Subfamily: Pangoniinae
- Tribe: Pangoniini
- Genus: Pangonius; Latreille, 1802

Type species
- Tabanus proboscideus Fabricius, 1794

Synonyms
- Pangonia Latreille, 1804; Macroglossa Westwood, 1835; Tacina Walker, 1850; Dasysilvius Enderlein, 1922; Taeniopangonia Szilády, 1923

= Pangonius =

Genus of flies

Pangonius is a genus within the horse-fly family (Tabanidae), often misspelled as Pangonia; Latreille originally published the name as Pangonius in 1802, emending it in 1804 to Pangonia, but the emendation is not valid under the International Code of Zoological Nomenclature. Some species that were earlier placed in this genus are now in the genus Philoliche.

== Species ==
- Pangonius affinis (Loew, 1859)
- Pangonius alluaudi Séguy, 1930
- Pangonius apertus (Loew, 1859)
- Pangonius argentatus (Szilády, 1923)
- Pangonius brancoi Dias, 1984
- Pangonius brevicornis (Kröber, 1921)
- Pangonius dimidiatus (Loew, 1859)
- Pangonius fasciatus (Latreille, 1811)
- Pangonius ferrugineus (Meigen, 1804)
- Pangonius flavocinctus (Szilády, 1923)
- Pangonius florae Leclercq & Maldès, 1987
- Pangonius fulvipes (Loew, 1859)
- Pangonius fumidus (Loew, 1859)
- Pangonius funebris (Macquart, 1846)
- Pangonius granatensis (Strobl, 1906)
- Pangonius griseipennis (Loew, 1859)
- Pangonius hassani (Leclercq, 1968)
- Pangonius haustellatus (Fabricius, 1781)
- Pangonius hermanni (Kröber, 1921)
- Pangonius kraussei Surcouf, 1921
- Pangonius lucidus (Szilády, 1923)
- Pangonius mauritanus (Linnaeus, 1767)
- Pangonius micans (Meigen, 1820)
- Pangonius obscuratus (Loew, 1859)
- Pangonius pictus (Macquart, 1834)
- Pangonius powelli (Séguy, 1930)
- Pangonius pyritosus (Loew, 1859)
- Pangonius raclinae Leclercq, 1960
- Pangonius rhynchocephalus (Kröber, 1921)
- Pangonius seitzianus (Enderlein, 1931)
- Pangonius sinensis (Enderlein, 1932)
- Pangonius sobradieli (Séguy, 1934)
- Pangonius striatus (Szilády, 1923)
- Pangonius theodori Zeegers, Kravchenko & Müller, 2013
- Pangonius variegatus (Fabricius, 1805)
- Pangonius villosus (Szilády, 1923)
- Pangonius vittipennis (Kröber, 1921)

=== Formerly placed here ===
- Pangonius longirostris, now Philoliche longirostris (Hardwicke, 1823)
