= Myioscaptia muscula =

Scientific classification
- Kingdom: Animalia
- Phylum: Arthropoda
- Clade: Pancrustacea
- Class: Insecta
- Order: Diptera
- Family: Tabanidae
- Subfamily: Pangoniinae
- Tribe: Scionini
- Genus: Myioscaptia
- Species: M. muscula

Binomial name
- Myioscaptia muscula English, 1955

Synonyms
- Scaptia muscula English, 1955

Species of fly

Myioscaptia muscula is a large horse fly native to Australia.

== Ecology ==
The larva of Scaptia muscula lives in the pit trap of an antlion larva and feeds on the prey that it catches.
