= Austroplex =

Scientific classification
- Kingdom: Animalia
- Phylum: Arthropoda
- Class: Insecta
- Order: Diptera
- Family: Tabanidae
- Subfamily: Pangoniinae
- Tribe: Pangoniini
- Genus: Austroplex; Mackerras, 1955

Type species
- Austroplex goldfinchi Mackerras, 1955

Genus of insects

Austroplex is a genus of horse flies in the family Tabanidae.

== Species ==
- Austroplex brevipalpis (Macquart, 1848)
- Austroplex chrysophilus (Walker, 1848)
- Austroplex goldfinchi Mackerras, 1955
