= Anzomyia =

Scientific classification
- Kingdom: Animalia
- Phylum: Arthropoda
- Class: Insecta
- Order: Diptera
- Family: Tabanidae
- Subfamily: Pangoniinae
- Tribe: Scionini
- Genus: Anzomyia; Lessard, 2012

Type species
- Scaptia anomala Mackerras, 1960

Genus of flies

Anzomyia is a genus of flies in the family Tabanidae.

== Species ==
- Anzomyia anomala (Mackerras, 1960)
- Anzomyia chrysomallis Lessard, 2012
- Anzomyia herculensis Lessard, 2012
- Anzomyia pegasus Lessard, 2012
