= Esenbeckia incisuralis =

Scientific classification
- Kingdom: Animalia
- Phylum: Arthropoda
- Class: Insecta
- Order: Diptera
- Family: Tabanidae
- Subfamily: Pangoniinae
- Tribe: Pangoniini
- Genus: Esenbeckia
- Species: E. incisuralis

Binomial name
- Esenbeckia incisuralis (Say, 1823)

Synonyms
- Pangonia incisa Wiedemann, 1828; Pangonia incisuralis Say, 1823; Ricardoa latiflagrum Enderlein, 1925

Species of fly

Esenbeckia incisuralis is a species of fly in the family Tabanidae.

== Distribution ==
United States, Mexico.
