= Stonemyia isabellina =

Scientific classification
- Kingdom: Animalia
- Phylum: Arthropoda
- Clade: Pancrustacea
- Class: Insecta
- Order: Diptera
- Family: Tabanidae
- Subfamily: Pangoniinae
- Tribe: Pangoniini
- Genus: Stonemyia
- Species: S. isabellina

Binomial name
- Stonemyia isabellina (Wiedemann, 1828)

Synonyms
- Pangonia pigra Osten Sacken, 1875; Silvius isabellinus Wiedemann, 1828

Species of fly

Stonemyia isabellina is a species of fly in the family Tabanidae.

== Distribution ==
United States
