= Esenbeckia delta =

Scientific classification
- Kingdom: Animalia
- Phylum: Arthropoda
- Class: Insecta
- Order: Diptera
- Family: Tabanidae
- Subfamily: Pangoniinae
- Tribe: Pangoniini
- Genus: Esenbeckia
- Species: E. delta

Binomial name
- Esenbeckia delta (Hine, 1920)

Synonyms
- Pangonia delta Hine, 1920

Species of fly

Esenbeckia delta is a species of fly in the family Tabanidae.

== Distribution ==
United States, Mexico.
