= Skepsis (disambiguation) =

Skepsis was an ancient settlement in Asia Minor.

Skepsis may also refer to:

- Skepsis (album), a death metal album by Through the Eyes of the Dead
- Skepsis (musician), an English musician

== See also ==
- Scepsis (fly), a genus of insects
- Skepticism
