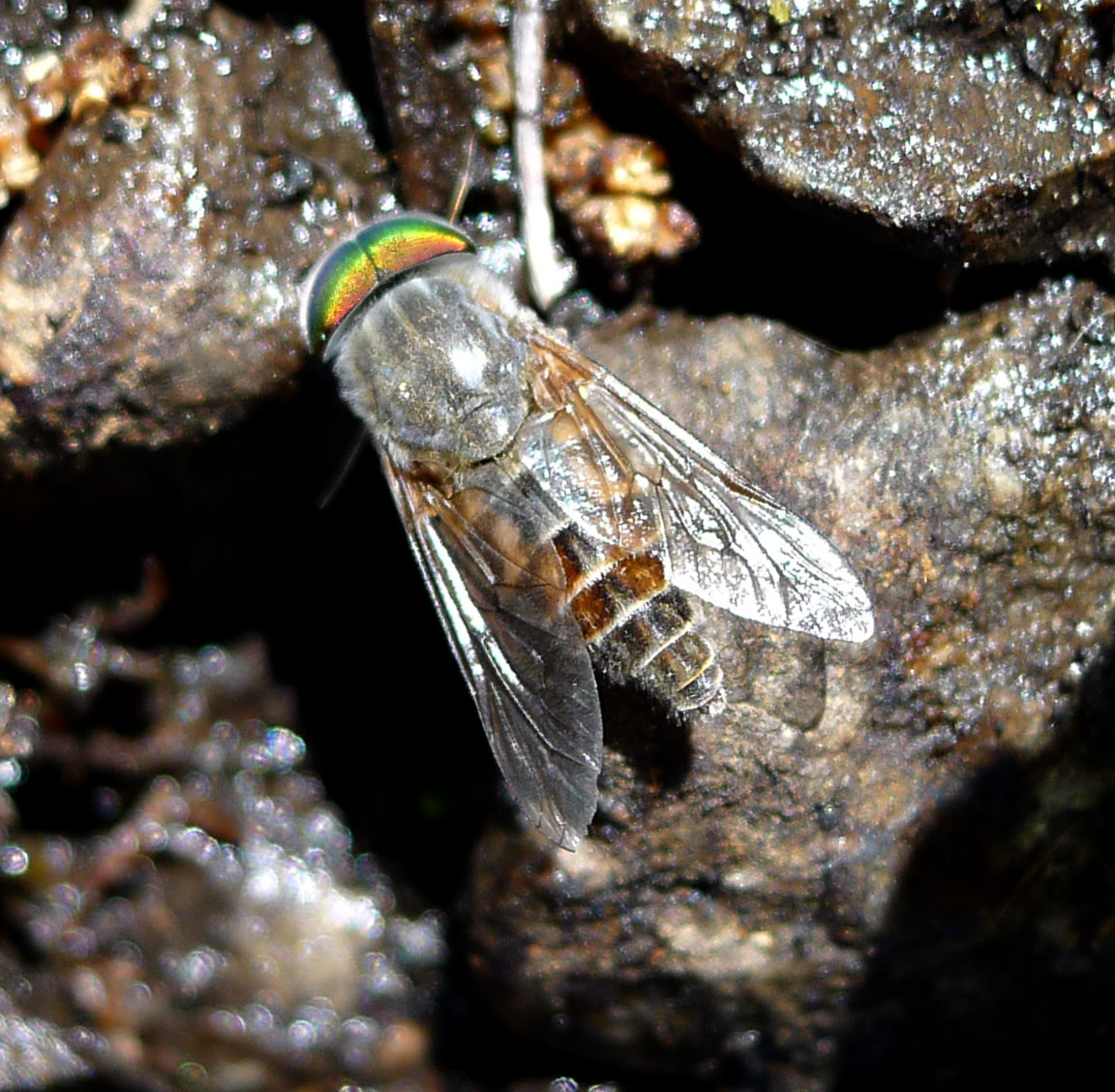

Scientific classification
- Kingdom: Animalia
- Phylum: Arthropoda
- Class: Insecta
- Order: Diptera
- Family: Tabanidae
- Subfamily: Pangoniinae
- Tribe: Pangoniini
- Genus: Stonemyia
- Species: S. fera

Binomial name
- Stonemyia fera Williston, 1887

= Stonemyia fera =

Species of fly

Stonemyia fera is a species of fly in the family Tabanidae.

== Distribution ==
Canada, United States.
