= Pangonius mauritanus =

Scientific classification
- Kingdom: Animalia
- Phylum: Arthropoda
- Class: Insecta
- Order: Diptera
- Family: Tabanidae
- Subfamily: Pangoniinae
- Tribe: Pangoniini
- Genus: Pangonius
- Species: P. mauritanus

Binomial name
- Pangonius mauritanus (Linnaeus, 1767)

Synonyms
- Tabanus mauritanus Linnaeus, 1767; Tabanus proboscideus Fabricius, 1794; Pangonia maculata Fabricius, 1805; Pangonia tabaniformis Latreille, 1805; Pangonia varipennis Latreille, 1811; Pangonia basalis Macquart, 1847; Pangonia maculata var. aethiops Szilády, 1923; Pangonia maculata var. maroccana Surcouf, 1924; Pangonia acuminata Enderlein, 1931

Species of fly

Pangonius mauritanus is a species of horse fly in the family Tabanidae.

== Distribution ==
Europe, North Africa
