= Asaphomyia =

Scientific classification
- Kingdom: Animalia
- Phylum: Arthropoda
- Class: Insecta
- Order: Diptera
- Family: Tabanidae
- Subfamily: Pangoniinae
- Tribe: Pangoniini
- Genus: Asaphomyia; Stone, 1953

Type species
- Asaphomyia texensis Stone, 1953

Synonyms
- Comops Brennan, 1935 (subgenus of Apatolestes)

Genus of insects

Asaphomyia is a genus of horse flies in the family Tabanidae.

== Species ==
- A. floridensis Pechuman, 1974
- A. texensis Stone, 1953
