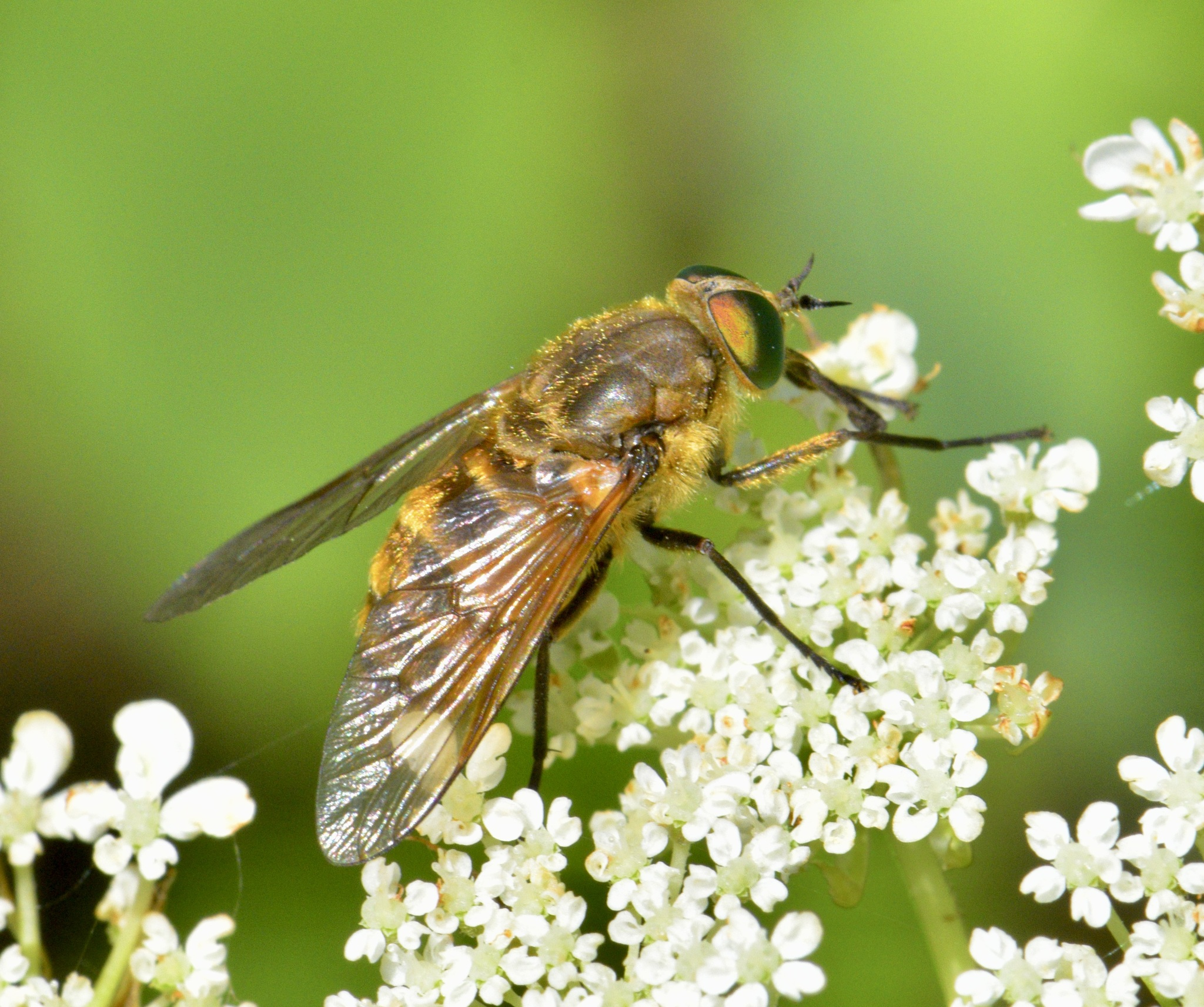

Scientific classification
- Kingdom: Animalia
- Phylum: Arthropoda
- Class: Insecta
- Order: Diptera
- Family: Tabanidae
- Subfamily: Pangoniinae
- Tribe: Pangoniini
- Genus: Stonemyia
- Species: S. tranquilla

Binomial name
- Stonemyia tranquilla (Osten Sacken, 1875)

Synonyms
- Pangonia tranquilla Osten Sacken, 1875

= Stonemyia tranquilla =

Species of fly

Stonemyia tranquilla, commonly known as the peaceful stonian horsefly, is a species of fly in the family Tabanidae. The fly is about 1.5 cm long and, unlike most other tabanid flies, does not need to suck blood to reproduce–hence the scientific name which translates to "tranquil".

== Distribution ==
Stonemyia tranquilla inhabits the United States and Canada, being most common in New England, New York, the St. Lawrence River Valley, Nova Scotia and New Brunswick, but is occasionally seen in the Midwest and the Appalachian Mountains southwards to North Carolina.
