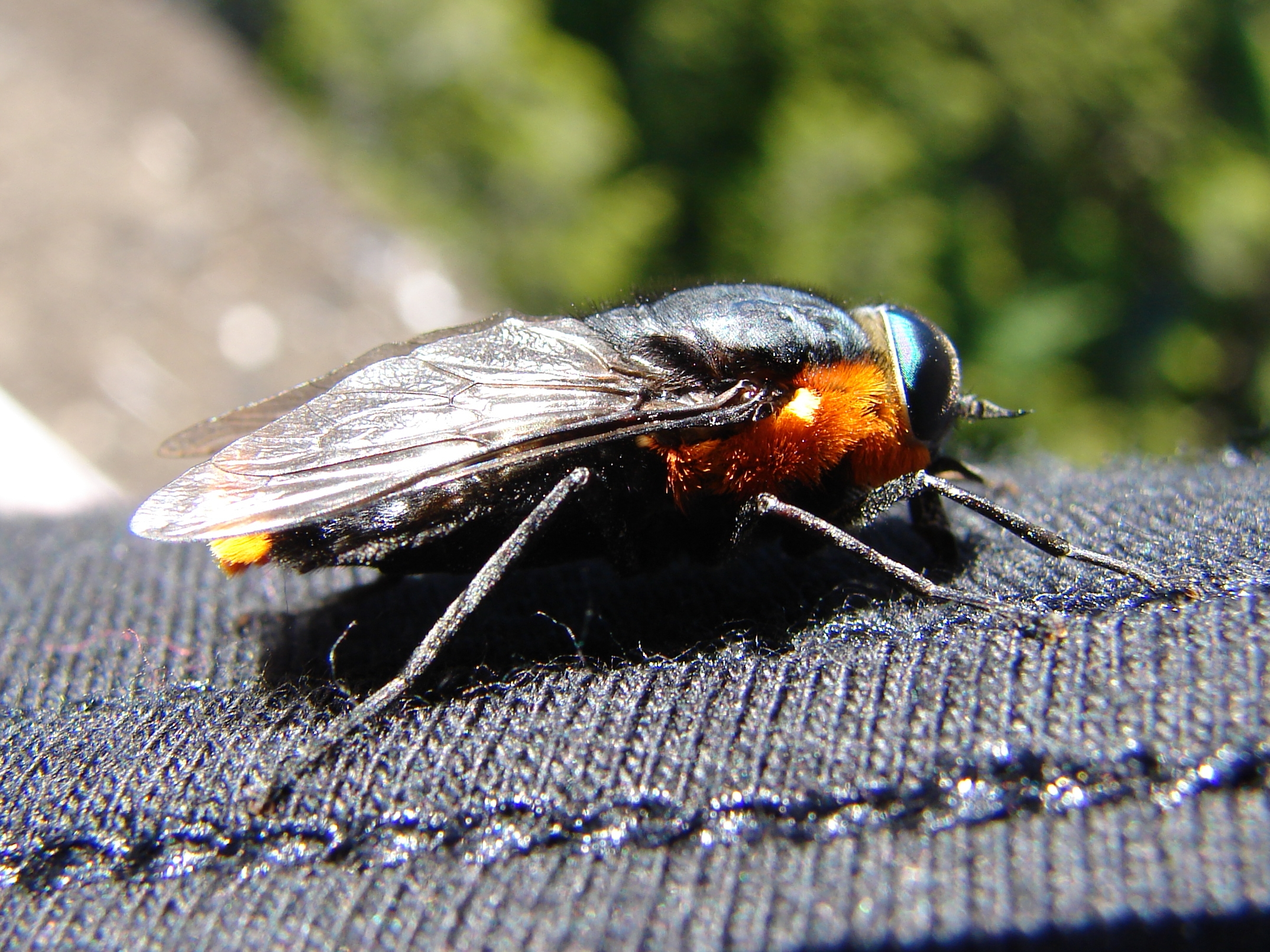
- Scaptia lata

Scientific classification
- Domain: Eukaryota
- Kingdom: Animalia
- Phylum: Arthropoda
- Class: Insecta
- Order: Diptera
- Family: Tabanidae
- Subfamily: Pangoniinae
- Tribe: Scionini; Enderlein, 1922

Synonyms
- Melpiinae Enderlein, 1922; Pityocerini Enderlein, 1922

= Scionini =

Tribe of insects

Scionini is a tribe of horse and deer flies in subfamily Pangoniinae of family Tabanidae.

== Genera ==
Genera according to the revised classification of Lessard (2014). The genera Goniops and Caenopangonia, included in Scionini by Moucha (1976), were transferred to their own monotypic tribes, Goniopsini and Mycteromyiini.

- Anzomyia Lessard, 2012
- Aotearomyia Lessard, 2014
- Apocampta Schiner, 1868
- Copidapha Enderlein, 1922
- Fidena Walker, 1850
- Lepmia Fairchild, 1969
- Myioscaptia Mackerras, 1955
- Osca Walker, 1850
- Palimmecomyia Taylor, 1917
- Parosca Enderlein, 1922
- Pityocera Giglio-Tos, 1896
- Plinthina Walker, 1850
- Pseudomelpia Enderlein, 1922
- Pseudoscione Lutz, 1918
- Scaptia Walker, 1850
- Scione Walker, 1850
- Triclista Enderlein, 1922
