= Therevopangonia =

Scientific classification
- Kingdom: Animalia
- Phylum: Arthropoda
- Class: Insecta
- Order: Diptera
- Family: Tabanidae
- Subfamily: Pangoniinae
- Tribe: Pangoniini
- Genus: Therevopangonia; Mackerras, 1955

Type species
- Therevopangonia insolita Mackerras, 1955

Genus of flies

Therevopangonia is a genus of flies in the family Tabanidae.

== Species ==
- Therevopangonia insolita Mackerras, 1955
