= Brennania =

Scientific classification
- Kingdom: Animalia
- Phylum: Arthropoda
- Class: Insecta
- Order: Diptera
- Family: Tabanidae
- Subfamily: Pangoniinae
- Tribe: Pangoniini
- Genus: Brennania; Philip, 1941

Type species
- Pangonia hera Osten Sacken, 1877

Synonyms
- Comops Brennan, 1935 (subgenus of Apatolestes)

Genus of insects

Brennania is a genus of flies in family Tabanidae. It was originally known as Comops, created as a subgenus of Apatolestes by Brennan (1935). Philip (1941) then raised it to genus level, but renamed it to Brennania (as it was preoccupied by Comops Aldrich, 1934).

== Species ==
The genus contains the following species:

- Brennania belkini (Philip, 1966) – Belkin's Dune Tabanid Fly
- Brennania hera (Osten Sacken, 1877)
