= Stonemyia rasa =

Scientific classification
- Kingdom: Animalia
- Phylum: Arthropoda
- Class: Insecta
- Order: Diptera
- Family: Tabanidae
- Subfamily: Pangoniinae
- Tribe: Pangoniini
- Genus: Stonemyia
- Species: S. rasa

Binomial name
- Stonemyia rasa (Loew, 1869)

Synonyms
- Pangonia rasa Loew, 1869

Species of fly

Stonemyia rasa is a species of fly in the family Tabanidae.

== Distribution ==
United States.
