= Apatolestes hinei =

Scientific classification
- Kingdom: Animalia
- Phylum: Arthropoda
- Class: Insecta
- Order: Diptera
- Family: Tabanidae
- Subfamily: Pangoniinae
- Tribe: Pangoniini
- Genus: Apatolestes
- Species: A. hinei

Binomial name
- Apatolestes hinei Brennan, 1935

Species of fly

Apatolestes hinei is a species of fly in the family Tabanidae.

== Distribution ==
United States.
