= Caenopangonia hirtipalpis =

Scientific classification
- Kingdom: Animalia
- Phylum: Arthropoda
- Class: Insecta
- Order: Diptera
- Family: Tabanidae
- Subfamily: Pangoniinae
- Tribe: Mycteromyiini
- Genus: Caenopangonia
- Species: C. hirtipalpis

Binomial name
- Caenopangonia hirtipalpis (Bigot, 1892)

Synonyms
- Diatomineura hirtipalpis Bigot, 1892

Species of fly

Caenopangonia hirtipalpis is a species of deer flies in the family Tabanidae.

== Distribution ==
Chile
