= Stonemyia tigris =

Scientific classification
- Kingdom: Animalia
- Phylum: Arthropoda
- Class: Insecta
- Order: Diptera
- Family: Tabanidae
- Subfamily: Pangoniinae
- Tribe: Pangoniini
- Genus: Stonemyia
- Species: S. tigris

Binomial name
- Stonemyia tigris (Bigot, 1880)

Synonyms
- Pangonia tigris Bigot, 1880

Species of fly

Stonemyia tigris is a species of fly in the family Tabanidae.

== Distribution ==
Iran, Transcaucasus.
