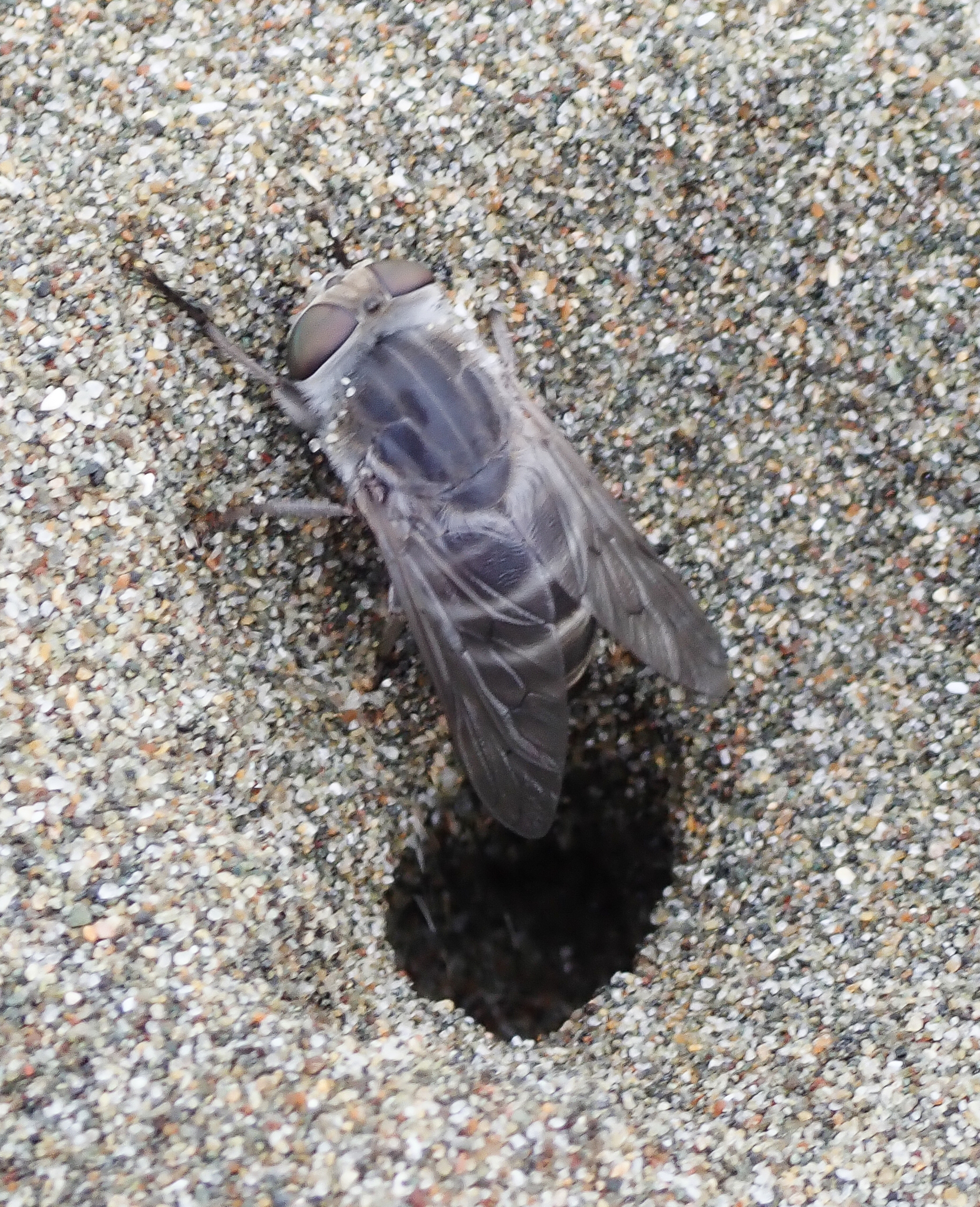

Scientific classification
- Kingdom: Animalia
- Phylum: Arthropoda
- Class: Insecta
- Order: Diptera
- Family: Tabanidae
- Subfamily: Pangoniinae
- Tribe: Pangoniini
- Genus: Apatolestes
- Species: A. actites

Binomial name
- Apatolestes actites Philip & Steffan, 1962

= Apatolestes actites =

Species of fly

Apatolestes actites is a species of fly in the horse-fly family Tabanidae.

== Distribution ==
United States.
