= June Halliday =

Australian biochemist (1930–2021)

June Wanda Halliday, AM (née von Alpen, 1930 – 21 March 2021) was an Australian biochemist and researcher of liver disease and iron metabolism. She was a pioneer in the use of serum ferritin and liver iron concentration as diagnostic aids for studying haemochromatosis.

== Early life ==
June Wanda von Alpen was born in 1930 in Brisbane, Queensland. She attended Somerville House girls' school from 1937 to 1946 and was School Captain. She studied her BSc at the University of Queensland from 1947, graduating with Honours in 1949. One of her early mentors was Ian Mackerras, the first director of the Queensland Institute of Medical Research. She undertook vacation research work with fellow student Marion Gillies, under the oversight of Dr MacKerras’ wife, parasitologist and researcher Dr Josephine MacKerras. She married microbiologist William Halliday in August 1952. She won a Fulbright grant to study overseas and from 1952 to 1955 undertook research toward a PhD at the University of Wisconsin. Her thesis was on biochemistry and bacteriology. Her husband also undertook his doctorate while in the U.S. Upon graduation, she took up a position with the Middlesex Hospital London as a Postdoctoral Research Fellow in the Courtnauld Institute of Biochemistry.

== Career ==
Halliday returned to Australia in 1956 and lectured in biochemistry with the Department of Pathology of the University of Queensland, researching lead poisoning and haematological problems. University policy at the time would not permit her to work full-time after the birth of her first child. The university relaxed that position in time, and she returned to part-time lecturing and research. In 1967 she moved to the Department of Medicine as an NHMRC Senior Research Officer and remained with this department until 1990. She became Professor and Head of the Liver Unit of the Queensland Institute of Medical Research in 1990. Halliday retired in 1996.

== Later life ==
Halliday was honoured with an Order of Australia Medal (A.M.) for services to medical research in 1990.

A Festschrift celebrating her career with the Queensland Institute of Medical Research was prepared in 1996.

Halliday was Secretary/Treasurer of the International Association for the Study of the Liver and President of the Gastroenterological Society of Queensland.

== Personal life and death ==
In 1952, she married fellow student William J. Halliday of Melbourne. They had three children.

June Halliday died on 21 March 2021.
