= Stonemyia californica =

Scientific classification
- Kingdom: Animalia
- Phylum: Arthropoda
- Class: Insecta
- Order: Diptera
- Family: Tabanidae
- Subfamily: Pangoniinae
- Tribe: Pangoniini
- Genus: Stonemyia
- Species: S. californica

Binomial name
- Stonemyia californica (Bigot, 1892)

Synonyms
- Diatomineura californica Bigot, 1892; Pangonia dives Williston, 1887; Pilimas beameri Philip, 1942; Silvius jonesi Cresson, 1919

Species of fly

Stonemyia californica is a species of fly in the family Tabanidae.

== Distribution ==
Canada, United States, Mexico.
