= Esenbeckia =

Esenbeckia may refer to:

- Esenbeckia (plant), a genus of flowering plants in family Rutaceae
- Esenbeckia (fly), a genus of horse-flies
