= Lepmia =

Scientific classification
- Kingdom: Animalia
- Phylum: Arthropoda
- Class: Insecta
- Order: Diptera
- Family: Tabanidae
- Subfamily: Pangoniinae
- Tribe: Scionini
- Genus: Lepmia; Fairchild, 1969

Type species
- Pangonia molesta Wiedemann, 1828

Genus of flies

Lepmia is a genus of horse flies in the family Tabanidae.

== Species ==
- Lepmia hibernus (Wilkerson & Coscarón, 1984)
- Lepmia molesta (Wiedemann, 1828)
- Lepmia seminigra (Ricardo, 1902)
