= Brennania belkini =

Conservation status
- Vulnerable (IUCN 2.3)

Scientific classification
- Kingdom: Animalia
- Phylum: Arthropoda
- Class: Insecta
- Order: Diptera
- Family: Tabanidae
- Subfamily: Pangoniinae
- Tribe: Pangoniini
- Genus: Brennania
- Species: B. belkini

Binomial name
- Brennania belkini (Philip, 1966)

Synonyms
- Apatolestes belkini Philip, 1966

Species of fly

Brennania belkini is a species of fly in the horse-fly family, Tabanidae. It is native to the Los Angeles area in California, and it is also found in Mexico. It is known commonly as Belkin's dune tabanid fly.
