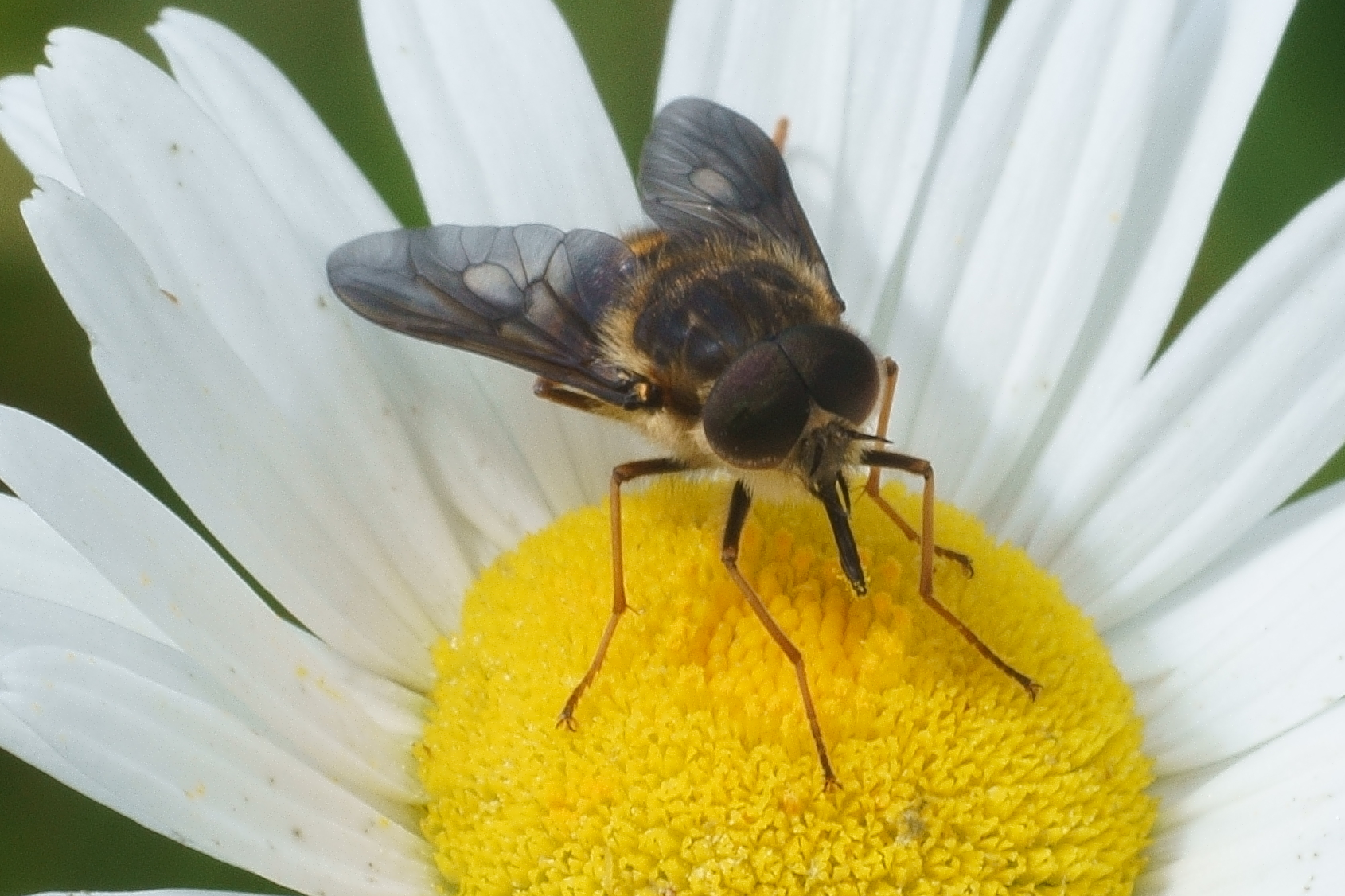

Scientific classification
- Kingdom: Animalia
- Phylum: Arthropoda
- Clade: Pancrustacea
- Class: Insecta
- Order: Diptera
- Family: Tabanidae
- Genus: Aotearomyia
- Species: A. adrel

Binomial name
- Aotearomyia adrel (Walker, 1850)

Synonyms
- List: Panagonia adrel (Walker, 1850); Panagonia hirticeps Nowicki, 1875; Scaptia adrel (Walker, 1850); Tabanus adrel (Walker, 1850)

= Aotearomyia adrel =

Species of fly

Aotearomyia adrel is a species of horse fly endemic to New Zealand.
