= Parosca =

Scientific classification
- Kingdom: Animalia
- Phylum: Arthropoda
- Class: Insecta
- Order: Diptera
- Family: Tabanidae
- Subfamily: Pangoniinae
- Tribe: Scionini
- Genus: Parosca; Enderlein, 1922

Type species
- Parosca viridiventris Macquart, 1838

Synonyms
- Listrapha Enderlein, 1922

Genus of flies

Parosca is a genus of flies in the family Tabanidae.

== Species ==
- Parosca latipalpis (Macquart, 1850)
- Parosca subulipalpis (Enderlein, 1929)
- Parosca viridiventris (Macquart, 1838)
