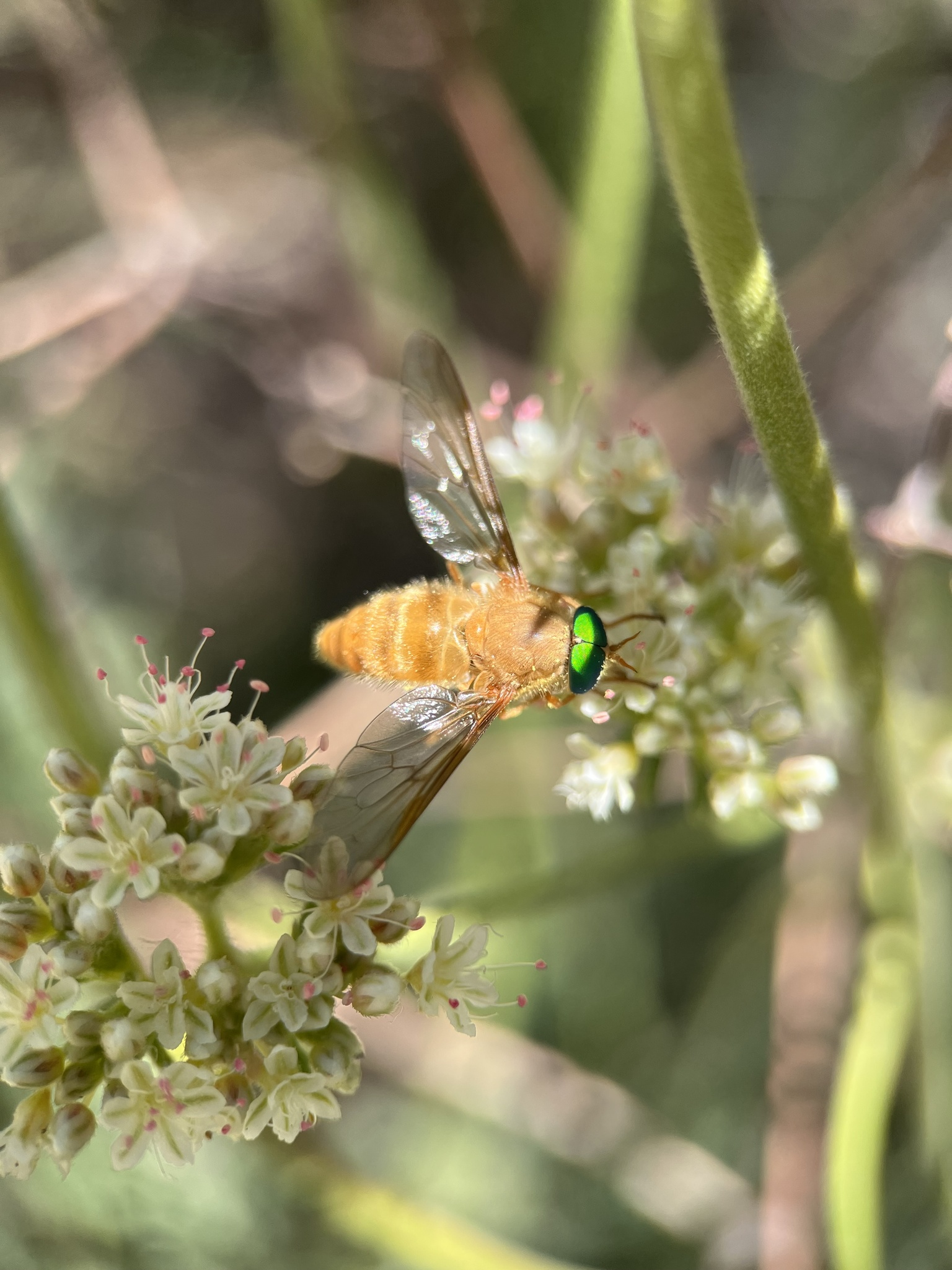

Scientific classification
- Kingdom: Animalia
- Phylum: Arthropoda
- Clade: Pancrustacea
- Class: Insecta
- Order: Diptera
- Family: Tabanidae
- Subfamily: Pangoniinae
- Tribe: Pangoniini
- Genus: Pegasomyia; Burger, 1985

Type species
- Corizoneura ruficornis Bigot, 1892

= Pegasomyia =

Genus of flies

Pegasomyia is a genus of flies in the family Tabanidae.

== Species ==
- Pegasomyia abaurea (Philip, 1941)
- Pegasomyia ruficornis (Bigot, 1892)
