= Triclista =

Scientific classification
- Kingdom: Animalia
- Phylum: Arthropoda
- Class: Insecta
- Order: Diptera
- Family: Tabanidae
- Subfamily: Pangoniinae
- Tribe: Scionini
- Genus: Triclista; Enderlein, 1922

Type species
- Pangonia limbinervis Macquart, 1855

Synonyms
- Erephopsis Rondani, 1863

Genus of flies

Triclista is a genus of flies in the family Tabanidae.

== Species ==
- Triclista guttata (Donovan, 1805)
- Triclista media (Walker, 1848)
- Triclista singularis (Macquart, 1846)
