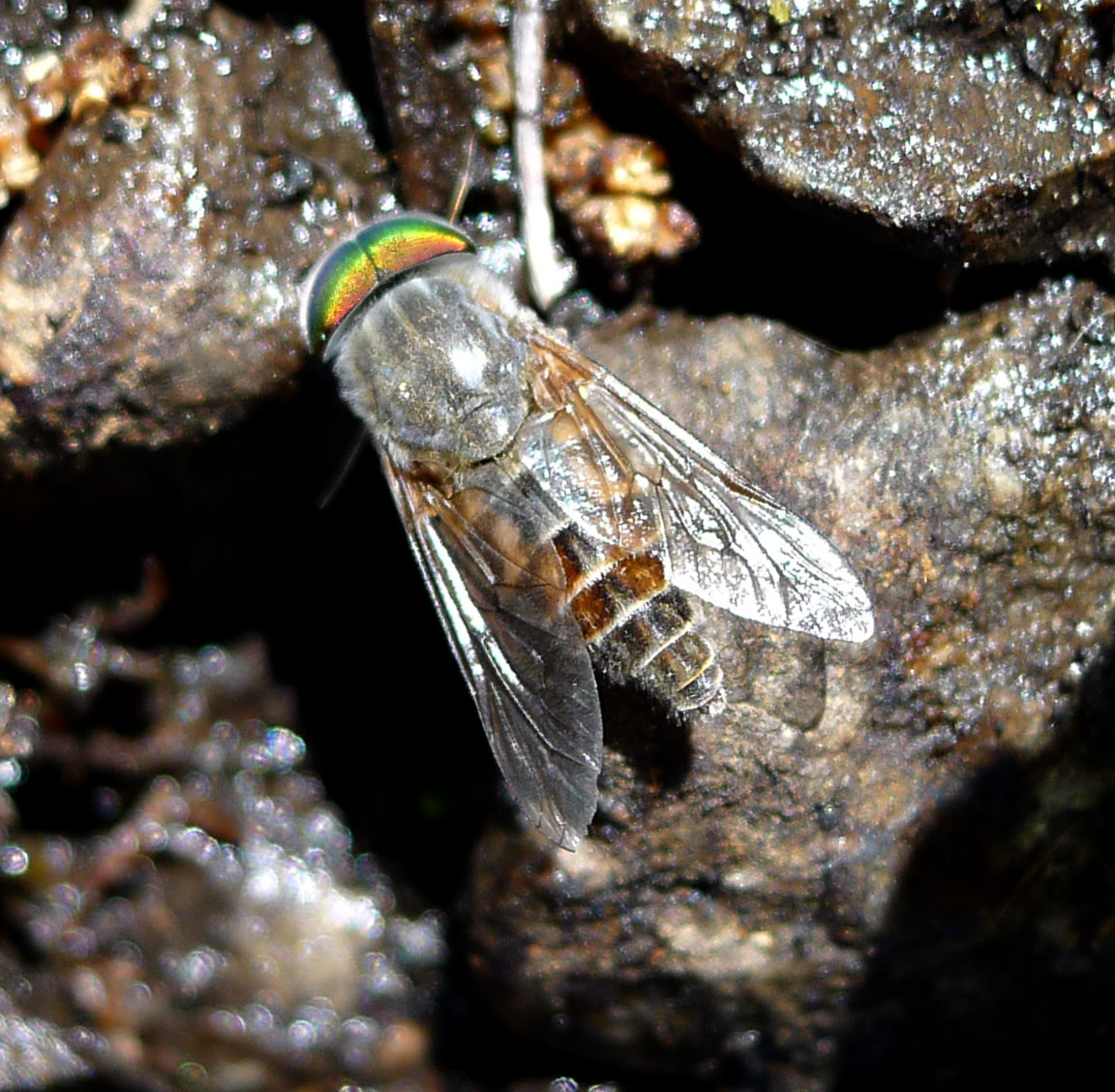
- Stonemyia fera

Scientific classification
- Kingdom: Animalia
- Phylum: Arthropoda
- Class: Insecta
- Order: Diptera
- Family: Tabanidae
- Subfamily: Pangoniinae
- Tribe: Pangoniini
- Genus: Stonemyia; Burger, 1985

Type species
- Pangonia tranquilla Osten Sacken, 1875

= Stonemyia =

Genus of flies

Stonemyia is a genus of flies in the family Tabanidae.

== Species ==
- Stonemyia amamiensis Yonetsu, 2000
- Stonemyia bazini (Surcouf, 1922)
- Stonemyia californica (Bigot, 1892)
- Stonemyia caucasica (Kröber, 1921)
- Stonemyia ishizuchiensis Yonetsu, 1987
- Stonemyia fera Williston, 1887
- Stonemyia hirticallus Chen & Cao, 1982
- Stonemyia isabellina (Wiedemann, 1828)
- Stonemyia rasa (Loew, 1869)
- Stonemyia tigris (Bigot, 1880)
- Stonemyia tranquilla (Osten Sacken, 1875)
- Stonemyia velutina (Bigot, 1892)
- Stonemyia yezoensis (Shiraki, 1918)
