= Palimmecomyia =

Scientific classification
- Kingdom: Animalia
- Phylum: Arthropoda
- Class: Insecta
- Order: Diptera
- Family: Tabanidae
- Subfamily: Pangoniinae
- Tribe: Scionini
- Genus: Palimmecomyia; Taylor, 1917

Type species
- Palimmecomyia celaenospila Taylor, 1917

Genus of insects

Palimmecomyia is a genus of horse flies in the family Tabanidae.

== Species ==
- Palimmecomyia pictipennis (Mackerras, 1960)
- Palimmecomyia walkeri (Newman, 1857)
