= Haematobia exigua =

Scientific classification
- Kingdom: Animalia
- Phylum: Arthropoda
- Clade: Pancrustacea
- Class: Insecta
- Order: Diptera
- Family: Muscidae
- Subfamily: Muscinae
- Tribe: Stomoxyini
- Genus: Haematobia
- Species: H. exigua

Binomial name
- Haematobia exigua Meijere, 1906

Synonyms
- Haematobia australis Malloch, 1932

Species of fly

Haematobia exigua, known as the buffalo fly, is a fly of the family Muscidae. The species was first described from Java and occurs across mainland and island South-east Asia. The species is introduced to Australia where it has a wide distribution, inhabiting tropical areas of Western Australia, Northern Territory, Queensland and New South Wales. It is widely considered a pest, and continues to cause much damage to livestock; like other species of genus Haematobia, buffalo flies must feed off the blood of mammals to survive, cutting through the skin with two separate mouthparts.

In 1928–1930, Australian entomologists Ian Murray Mackerras and Mabel Josephine Mackerras did substantial research into buffalo fly, increasing knowledge into methods of their control. Josephine Mackerras' research on blowfly infestation led to many papers being published, both alone and in collaboration with her husband and scientific partner Murray Mackerras.
