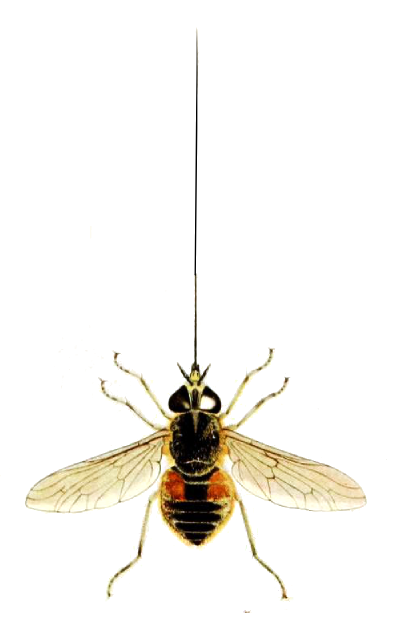

Scientific classification
- Kingdom: Animalia
- Phylum: Arthropoda
- Clade: Pancrustacea
- Class: Insecta
- Order: Diptera
- Family: Tabanidae
- Subfamily: Pangoniinae
- Tribe: Philolichini
- Genus: Philoliche
- Species: P. longirostris

Binomial name
- Philoliche longirostris (Hardwicke, 1823)

Synonyms
- Pangonia longirostris Hardwicke, 1823

= Philoliche longirostris =

Species of fly

Philoliche longirostris is a fly of the Tabanidae family that is found in India, Nepal specifically the Himalayas. It was first described and given a binomial name by Thomas Hardwicke in 1823.

== Description ==
P. longirostris is especially notable by its proboscis, which is "many times longer than its body". Adults of the species in the Himalayas are said to emerge after the rains in July and are not seen after September. Their emergence matches the flowering of several species of Roscoea and it has been suggested that they may have coevolved with Philoliche.

Males and females feed on nectar using the long mouthparts formed by the prementum of the labium. Females, in addition, feed on blood using the mandibular and maxillary structures which are much shorter.
