= Pseudomelpia =

Scientific classification
- Kingdom: Animalia
- Phylum: Arthropoda
- Clade: Pancrustacea
- Class: Insecta
- Order: Diptera
- Family: Tabanidae
- Subfamily: Pangoniinae
- Tribe: Scionini
- Genus: Pseudomelpia; Enderlein, 1922

Type species
- Pseudomelpia horrens Enderlein, 1925

Genus of flies

Pseudomelpia is a genus of flies in the family Tabanidae.

== Species ==
- Pseudomelpia horrens Enderlein, 1925
