= Zophina =

Scientific classification
- Kingdom: Animalia
- Phylum: Arthropoda
- Class: Insecta
- Order: Diptera
- Family: Tabanidae
- Subfamily: Pangoniinae
- Genus: Zophina; Philip, 1954

Type species
- Apatolestes eiseni Townsend, 1895

Genus of flies

Zophina is a genus of flies in the family Tabanidae.

== Species ==
- Zophina eiseni (Townsend, 1895)
