= Copidapha =

Scientific classification
- Kingdom: Animalia
- Phylum: Arthropoda
- Clade: Pancrustacea
- Class: Insecta
- Order: Diptera
- Family: Tabanidae
- Subfamily: Pangoniinae
- Tribe: Scionini
- Genus: Copidapha; Enderlein, 1922

Type species
- Copidapha bifasciata Enderlein, 1922

Synonyms
- Scaptiella Enderlein, 1923; Astypia Enderlein, 1925

Genus of flies

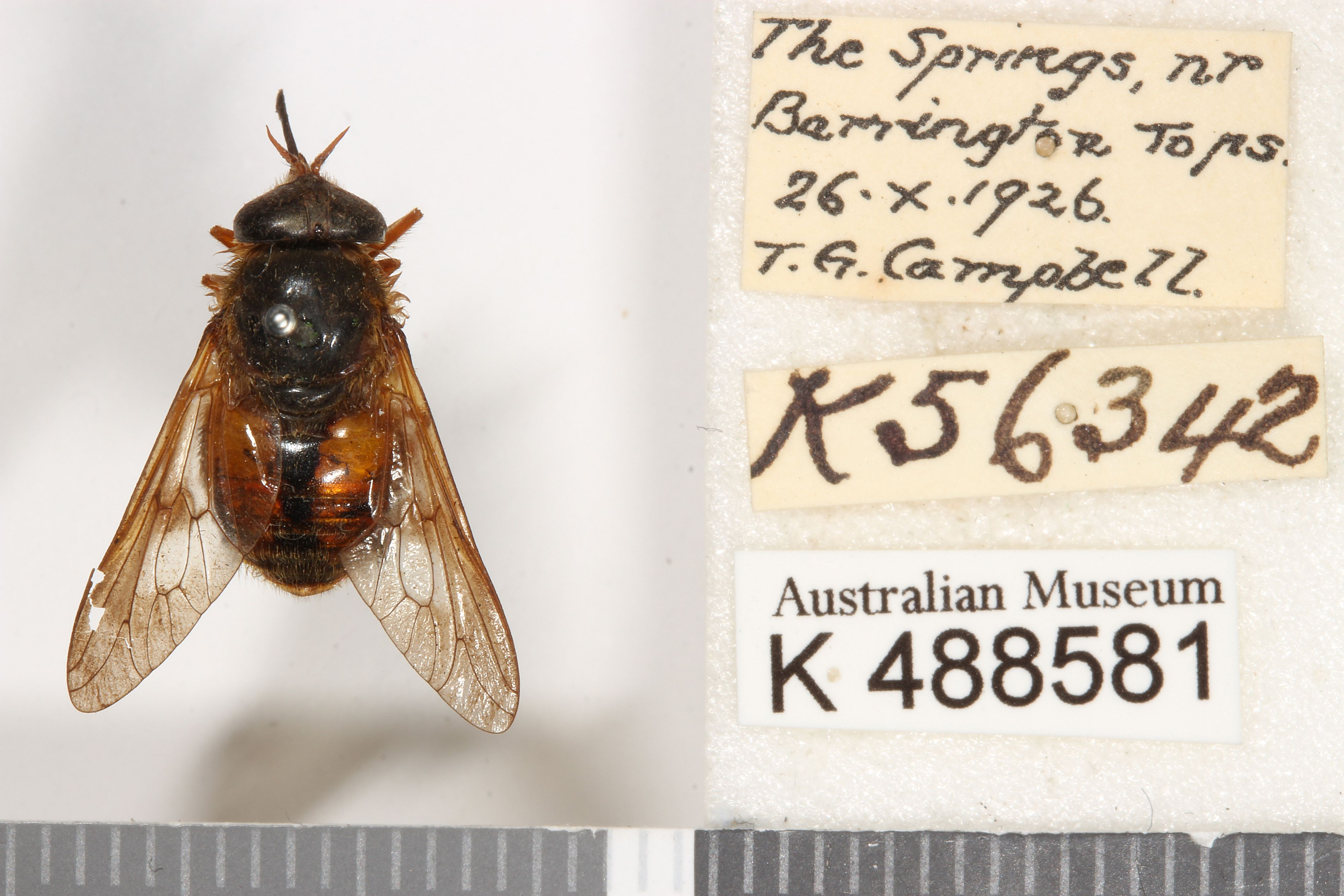
Copidapha rufonigra

Copidapha is a genus of flies in the family Tabanidae.

== Species ==
- Copidapha calabyi (Mackerras, 1960)
- Copidapha clavata (Macquart, 1837)
- Copidapha gemina (Walker, 1848)
- Copidapha roei (Macleay, 1826)
- Copidapha subappendiculata (Macquart, 1850)
