= Caenoprosopon =

Scientific classification
- Kingdom: Animalia
- Phylum: Arthropoda
- Class: Insecta
- Order: Diptera
- Family: Tabanidae
- Subfamily: Pangoniinae
- Tribe: Pangoniini
- Genus: Caenoprosopon; Ricardo, 1915

Type species
- Caenoprosopon wainwrighti Ricardo, 1915

Synonyms
- Cryptoplectria Enderlein, 1923

Genus of insects

Caenoprosopon is a genus of horse flies in the family Tabanidae.

== Species ==
- Caenoprosopon australe (Ricardo, 1915)
- Caenoprosopon dycei Mackerras, 1960
- Caenoprosopon minus (Taylor, 1918)
- Caenoprosopon nigrovittatum (Ferguson & Hill, 1920)
- Caenoprosopon trichocerum (Bigot, 1892)
