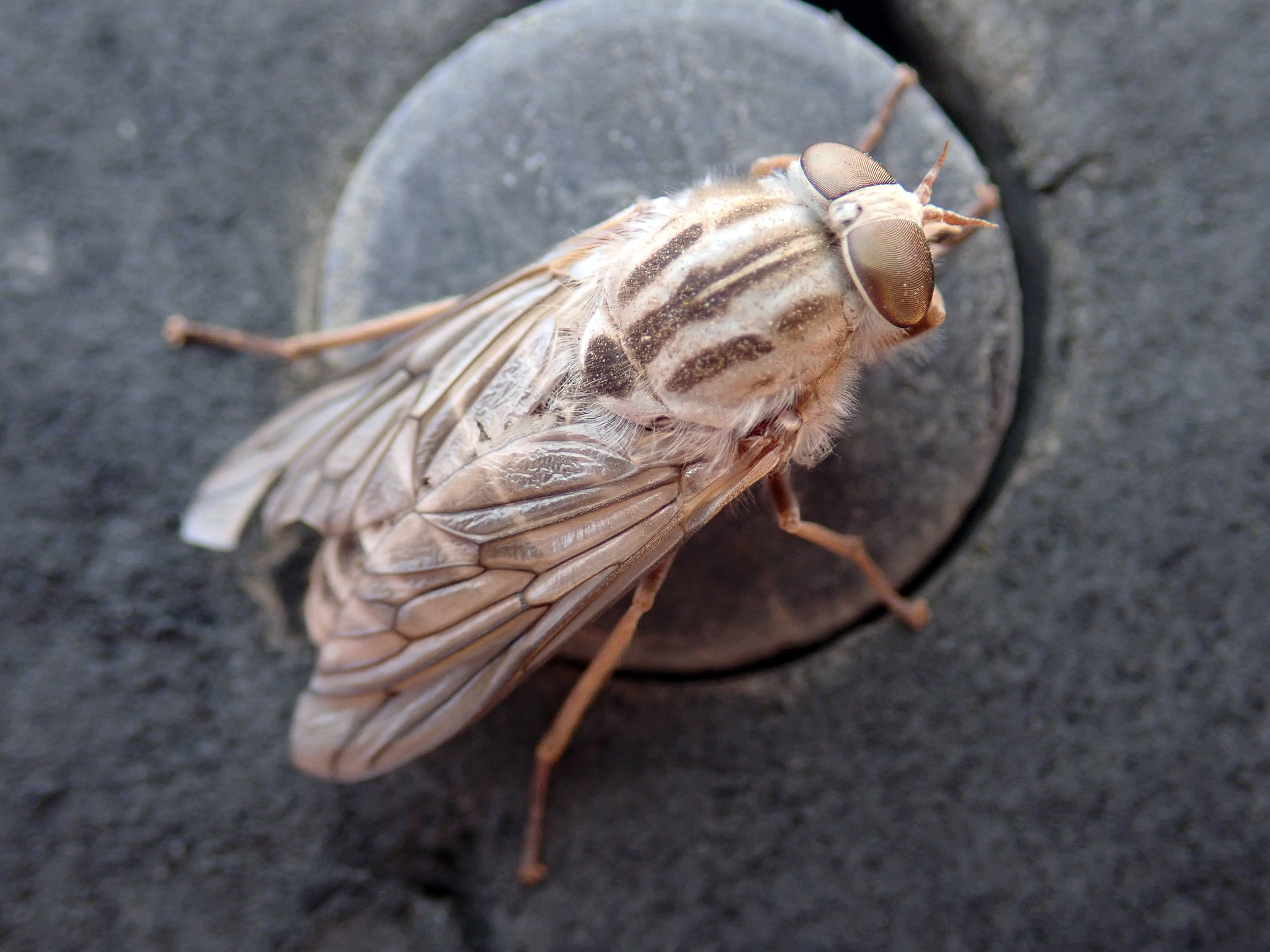
- Ectenopsis mackerrasi

Scientific classification
- Kingdom: Animalia
- Phylum: Arthropoda
- Class: Insecta
- Order: Diptera
- Family: Tabanidae
- Subfamily: Pangoniinae
- Tribe: Pangoniini
- Genus: Ectenopsis; Macquart, 1838

Type species
- Chrysops vulpecula Wiedemann, 1828

Synonyms
- Parasilvius Ferguson, 1921; Leptonopsis Mackerras, 1955; Paranopsis Mackerras, 1955

= Ectenopsis =

Genus of insects

Ectenopsis is a genus of horse flies in the family Tabanidae.

== Species ==
- Ectenopsis angusta (Macquart, 1847)
- Ectenopsis australis Ricardo, 1917
- Ectenopsis erratica (Walker, 1848)
- Ectenopsis fulva (Ferguson, 1921)
- Ectenopsis fusca Mackerras, 1956
- Ectenopsis hamlyni (Taylor, 1917)
- Ectenopsis lutulenta (Hutton, 1901)
- Ectenopsis mackerrasi Burger, 1996
- Ectenopsis nigripennis Taylor, 1918
- Ectenopsis norrisi Mackerras, 1956
- Ectenopsis occidentalis Mackerras, 1956
- Ectenopsis victoriensis Ferguson, 1921
- Ectenopsis vittata Mackerras, 1955
- Ectenopsis vulpecula (Wiedemann, 1828)
