= Myioscaptia =

Scientific classification
- Kingdom: Animalia
- Phylum: Arthropoda
- Class: Insecta
- Order: Diptera
- Family: Tabanidae
- Subfamily: Pangoniinae
- Tribe: Scionini
- Genus: Myioscaptia; Mackerras, 1955

Type species
- Pangonia violacea Macquart, 1850

Genus of insects

Myioscaptia is a genus of horse flies in the family Tabanidae.

== Species ==
- Myioscaptia bancrofti (Austen, 1912)
- Myioscaptia calliphora (Mackerras, 1960)
- Myioscaptia collessi (Lessard, 2013)
- Myioscaptia ferromontana (Daniels, 2011)
- Myioscaptia gibbula (Walker, 1848)
- Myioscaptia inopinata (Fairchild & Mackerras, 1977)
- Myioscaptia lambkinae (Lessard, 2013)
- Myioscaptia muscula (English, 1955)
- Myioscaptia nigroapicalis (Mackerras, 1960)
- Myioscaptia nigrocincta (Mackerras, 1960)
- Myioscaptia violacea (Macquart, 1850)
