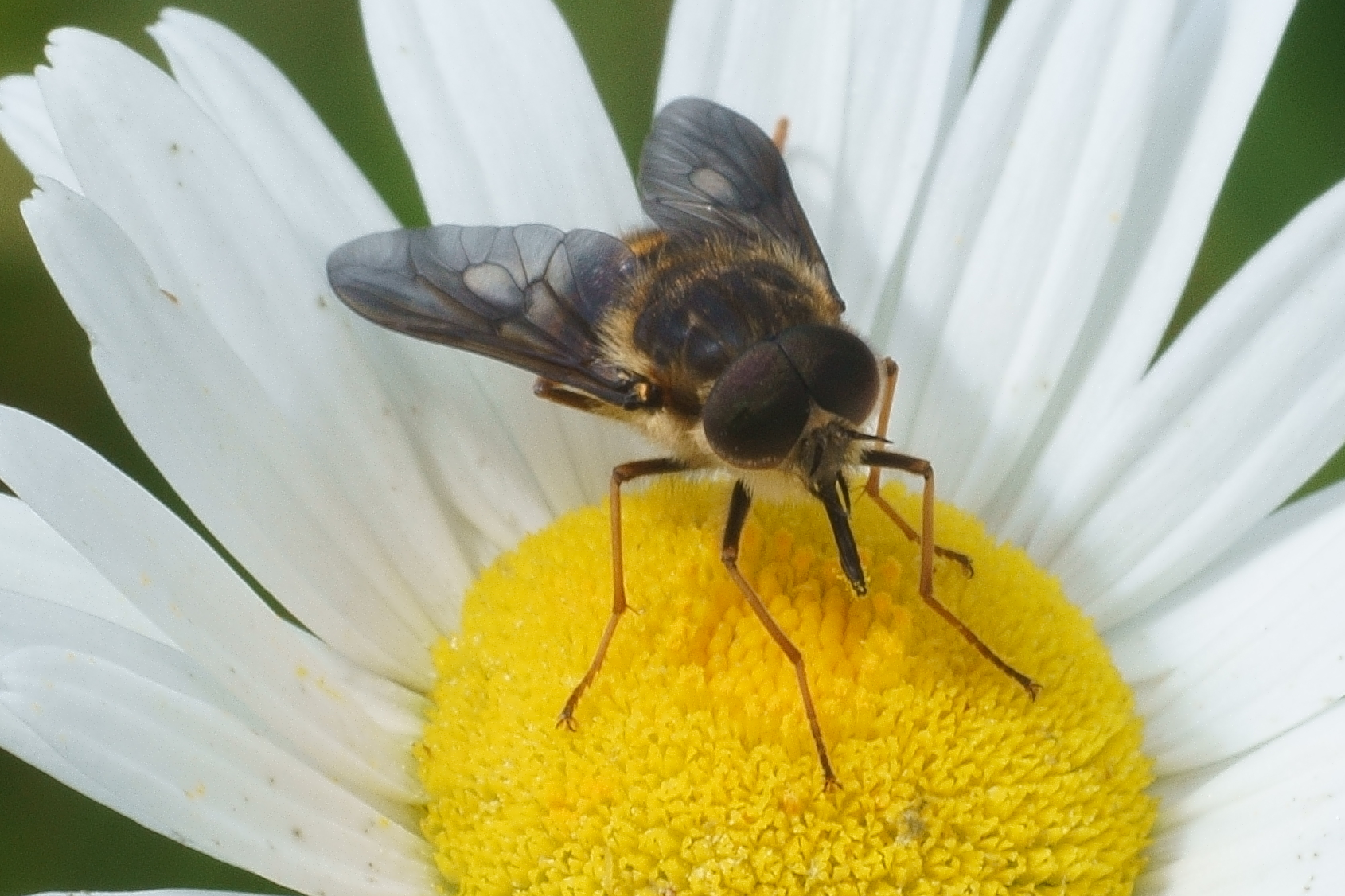
- Aotearomyia adrel

Scientific classification
- Kingdom: Animalia
- Phylum: Arthropoda
- Class: Insecta
- Order: Diptera
- Family: Tabanidae
- Subfamily: Pangoniinae
- Tribe: Scionini
- Genus: Aotearomyia; Lessard, 2014

Type species
- Pangonia adrel Walker, 1850

= Aotearomyia =

Genus of flies

Aotearomyia is a genus of flies in the family Tabanidae.

== Distribution ==
New Zealand.

== Species ==
- Aotearomyia adrel (Walker, 1850)
- Aotearomyia brevipalpis (Kröber, 1931)
- Aotearomyia lerda (Walker, 1850)
- Aotearomyia milleri (Mackerras, 1957)
- Aotearomyia montana (Hutton, 1901)
- Aotearomyia ricardoae (Hutton, 1901)
