= Pseudoscione =

Scientific classification
- Kingdom: Animalia
- Phylum: Arthropoda
- Class: Insecta
- Order: Diptera
- Family: Tabanidae
- Subfamily: Pangoniinae
- Tribe: Scionini
- Genus: Pseudoscione; Lutz, 1918

Type species
- Diatomineura longipennis Ricardo, 1902

Genus of flies

Pseudoscione is a genus of flies in the family Tabanidae.

== Species ==
- Pseudoscione albifrons (Macquart, 1838)
- Pseudoscione dorsoguttata (Macquart, 1850)
- Pseudoscione fenestrata (Macquart, 1846)
- Pseudoscione flavipes (Enderlein, 1929)
- Pseudoscione longipennis (Ricardo, 1902)
- Pseudoscione macquarti (Guerin-Meneville, 1838)
- Pseudoscione stictica (Wilkerson & Coscarón, 1984)
- Pseudoscione subandina (Philippi, 1865)
- Pseudoscione vittata (Philippi, 1865)
