= Braunsiomyia =

Scientific classification
- Kingdom: Animalia
- Phylum: Arthropoda
- Class: Insecta
- Order: Diptera
- Family: Tabanidae
- Subfamily: Pangoniinae
- Tribe: Braunsiomyiini
- Genus: Braunsiomyia; Bequaert, 1924

Type species
- Brodenia cinerea Surcouf, 1921

Genus of flies

Braunsiomyia is a genus of horseflies of the family Tabanidae.

== Species ==
- Braunsiomyia tigrina Dias & Sous, 1957
- Braunsiomyia cinerea (Surcouf, 1921)
