= Nagatomyia =

Scientific classification
- Kingdom: Animalia
- Phylum: Arthropoda
- Class: Insecta
- Order: Diptera
- Family: Tabanidae
- Subfamily: Pangoniinae
- Tribe: Pangoniini
- Genus: Nagatomyia; Murdoch & Takashasi, 1961

Type species
- Nagatomyia melanica Murdoch & Takashasi, 1961

Genus of insects

Nagatomyia is a genus of horse flies in the family Tabanidae.

== Distribution ==
Japan.

== Species ==
- Nagatomyia melanica Murdoch & Takahasi, 1961
