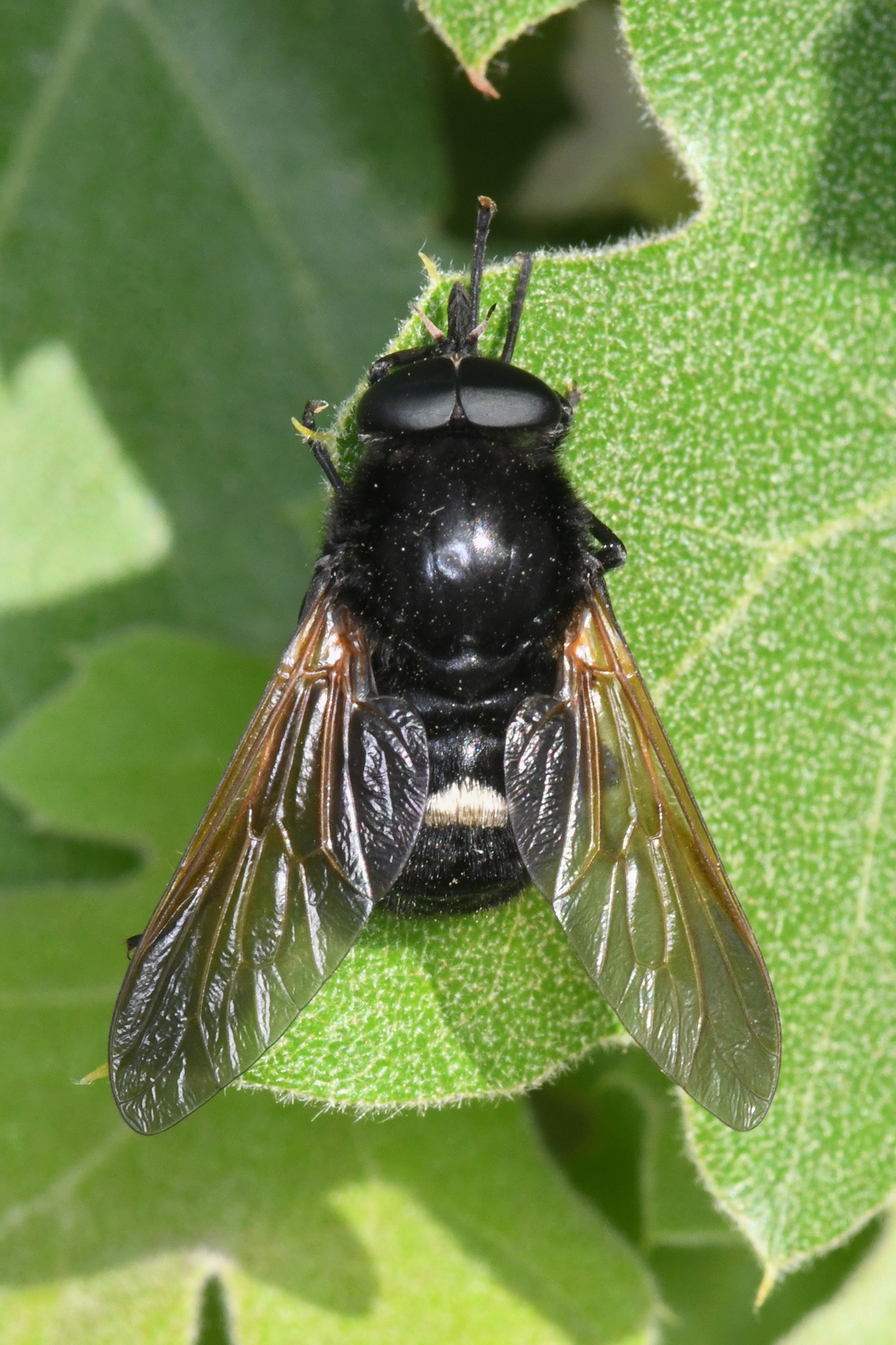

Scientific classification
- Kingdom: Animalia
- Phylum: Arthropoda
- Class: Insecta
- Order: Diptera
- Family: Tabanidae
- Genus: Stonemyia
- Species: S. velutina

Binomial name
- Stonemyia velutina (Bigot, 1892)

Synonyms
- Stonemyia volutina (erroneous)

= Stonemyia velutina =

Species of fly

Stonemyia velutina, the velvety stonian horsefly, is a rare species of fly in the family Tabanidae endemic to California. First described in 1892, it was not sighted between 1942 and its rediscovery in 2023, and prematurely declared extinct in 1996. Not much is yet known about its habitat or behavior, but it is thought that it may thrive in fire-disturbed chaparral.
