= Apocampta =

Scientific classification
- Kingdom: Animalia
- Phylum: Arthropoda
- Class: Insecta
- Order: Diptera
- Family: Tabanidae
- Subfamily: Pangoniinae
- Tribe: Scionini
- Genus: Apocampta; Schiner, 1868

Type species
- Chrysops subcana Walker, 1848

Genus of flies

Apocampta is a genus of flies in the family Tabanidae.

== Species ==
- Apocampta subcana (Walker, 1848)
