= Goniops =

Scientific classification
- Kingdom: Animalia
- Phylum: Arthropoda
- Class: Insecta
- Order: Diptera
- Family: Tabanidae
- Subfamily: Pangoniinae
- Tribe: Goniopsini
- Genus: Goniops; Aldrich, 1892
- Species: G. chrysocoma

Binomial name
- Goniops chrysocoma (Osten Sacken, 1875)

Genus of flies

Goniops chrysocoma is a species of fly found in North America. It is the only species in the genus Goniops, which is in the horse and deer flies family Tabanidae.

== Distribution ==
Goniops chrysocoma is found in Canada and the United States.
