= Haematozoa =

Subclass of parasitic eukaryotes

Hematozoa is a subclass of blood parasites of the Apicomplexa clade. Well known examples include the Plasmodium spp. which cause malaria in humans and Theileria which causes theileriosis in cattle. A large number of species are known to infect birds and are transmitted by insect vectors. The pattern in which Haematozoa infect a host cell depends on the genera of the blood parasite. Plasmodium and Leucozytozoon displace the nucleus of the host cell so that the parasite can take control of the cell where as Hemoproteus completely envelops the nucleus in a host cell.

Infections of haematozoa can have adverse fitness effects on certain species. Species that have been isolated or have not been exposed to the infection have been found to be especially vulnerable to pathogenic effects. The infection effects can persist in avian host species through long-distance migrations.

Blood parasites that have been studied were found to be transmitted by hematophagous (bloodsucking) dipteran (insect) vectors that have life stages in both aquatic and aerial environments.

== Plasmodium ==
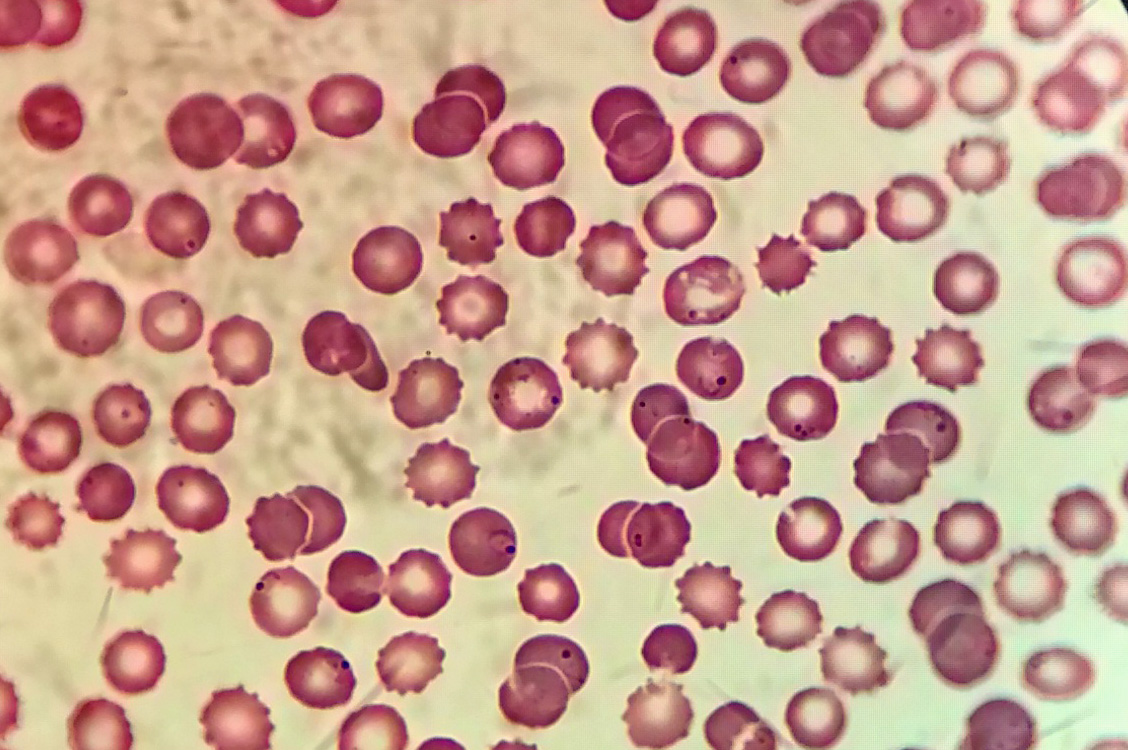
Plasmodium in erythrocytic cycle

Plasmodium, a genus consisting of over 170 species, infects mammals, reptiles, birds, and amphibians. Blood parasites of the Plasmodium genus cause malaria, which most commonly infect vertebrates with only four strains known to infect humans. Species of blood parasites that infect humans include Plasmodium falciparum, Plasmodium vivax, Plasmodiun ovale, and Plasmodium malariae. The parasites are transmitted through malaria infected mosquitos which inject sporozoites, the parasite's infective cells, into human hosts. When injected, sporozoites migrate to the liver where they replicate and rupture to increase the spread of the parasitic infection inside the host. The study of Plasmodium parasites has been significant in serving the role as a model organism for human malaria research. Similarities in pathological effects of parasites on avian hosts have been found in parasites infected with malaria in humans by transmission of mosquito bites.

== Theileria ==
Theileria is a haematozoan parasite, mainly found in coastal areas, that is transmitted by Haemaphysalis longicornis ticks that emerged from the Eastern hemisphere. Cases of Theileria orientalis were recently found in the Eastern United States in 2017 where cattle in Virginia presented symptoms concurrent with the parasite. However, further investigation identified the tick to be prevalent in the United States as early as 2010, with eight other states along the coast detecting this parasite. The Theileria orientalis parasite, like other haematozoa, infect erythrocytes, causing chronic anemia resulting in illness and death of cattle. Infections by the tick parasite induce symptoms such as anemia, jaundice, and anorexia in cattle. Cattle imported from prevalent Theileria orientalis areas are often quarantined from a naïve herd to prevent the spread of the parasite to susceptible cattle. Identification of Theileria orientalis is achieved by the sequencing of blood samples to identify two key features of the parasite, a small ribosomal subunit and a major piroplasm surface protein.

== Avian infections ==
Avian haemosporidians include the Plasmodium, Haemoproteus, and Leucocytozoon genera. Avian species can have mixed infections in which multiple genera of haemosporidians are involved, which provides additional challenges in identification of the haemosporidian. Avian haemosporidians are expressed globally with the exception of polar regions. They are mainly found in wet tropical climates, which provide easy transmission of haematozoan infections. Avian species serve adequate hosts that transmit haematozoa during migratory periods, which increases fitness of the parasite. Avian species that exist in large flocks, such as Waterfowl, are adequate hosts and easily transmit the infection due to close proximity in flocks. Symptoms of avian haemosporidians include anemia, weight loss, and mortality. Haemosporidian parasites are detected by highly sensitive and specific PCR techniques as well as microscopic examination. The parasites are important to understand the infections and strategies to prevent further transmission of the parasite.

== See also ==
- Plasmodium
- Theileria
