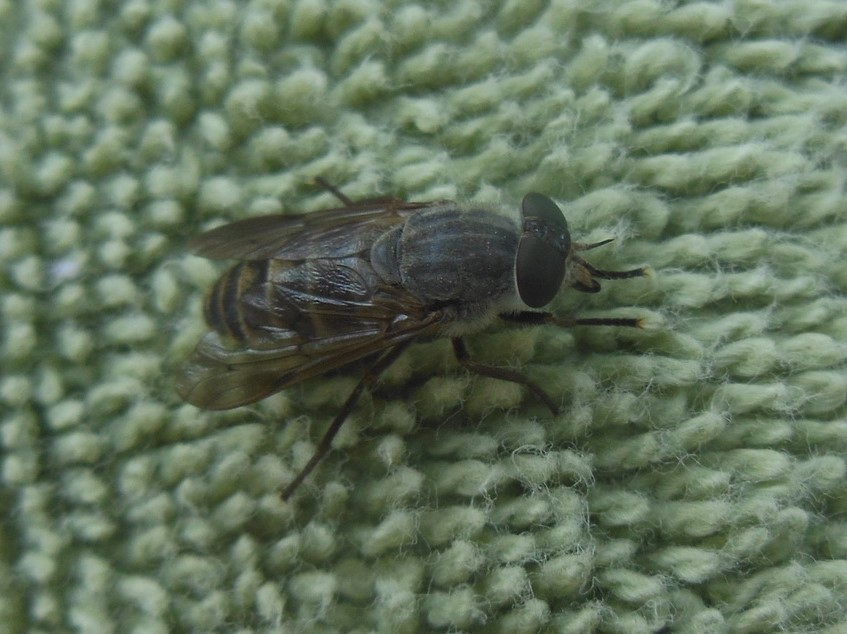

Scientific classification
- Kingdom: Animalia
- Phylum: Arthropoda
- Clade: Pancrustacea
- Class: Insecta
- Order: Diptera
- Family: Tabanidae
- Subfamily: Pangoniinae
- Tribe: Pangoniini
- Genus: Apatolestes; Williston, 1885

Type species
- Apatolestes comastes Williston, 1885

= Apatolestes =

Genus of insects

Apatolestes is a genus of horse flies (family Tabanidae).

== Species ==
The genus contains the following species:

- Apatolestes actites Philip & Steffan, 1962
- Apatolestes affinis Philip, 1941
- Apatolestes aitkeni Philip, 1941
- Apatolestes albipilosus Brennan, 1935
- Apatolestes ater Brennan, 1935
- Apatolestes colei Philip, 1941
- Apatolestes comastes Williston, 1885
- Apatolestes hinei Brennan, 1935
- Apatolestes parkeri Philip, 1941
- Apatolestes philipi Pechuman, 1985
- Apatolestes rossi Philip, 1950 – (Ross's Apatalestes Tabanid Fly)
- Apatolestes villosulus (Bigot, 1892)
- Apatolestes willistoni Brennan, 1935
- Apatolestes rugosus Middlekauff & Lane, 1976

The following are synonyms of other species:

- Apatolestes belkini Philip, 1966 Synonym of Brennania belkini (Philip, 1966)
- Apatolestes bekini Philip, 1966(?): Synonym of Brennania belkini (Philip, 1966)
- Apatolestes comastes var. fulvipes Philip, 1960: Synonym of A. willistoni Brennan, 1935
- Apatolestes comastes var. willistoni Brennan, 1935: Synonym of A. willistoni Brennan, 1935
- Apatolestes eiseni Townsend, 1895: Synonym of Zophina eiseni (Townsend, 1895)
- Apatolestes lutulentus Hutton, 1901: Synonym of Ectenopsis lutulenta (Hutton, 1901)
- Apatolestes similis Brennan, 1935: Synonym of A. villosulus (Bigot, 1892)
