= Caenopangonia =

Scientific classification
- Kingdom: Animalia
- Phylum: Arthropoda
- Class: Insecta
- Order: Diptera
- Family: Tabanidae
- Subfamily: Pangoniinae
- Tribe: Mycteromyiini
- Genus: Caenopangonia; Kröber, 1930

Type species
- Diatomineura hirtipalpis Bigot, 1892

Genus of flies

Caenopangonia is a genus of horse flies in the family Tabanidae.

== Species ==
- Caenopangonia aspera (Philip, 1958)
- Caenopangonia brevirostris (Philippi, 1865)
- Caenopangonia cerdai Krolow, Henriques & González, 2016
- Caenopangonia coscaroni Krolow, Henriques & González, 2016
- Caenopangonia hirtipalpis (Bigot, 1892)
