= Scepsis (fly) =

Scientific classification
- Kingdom: Animalia
- Phylum: Arthropoda
- Class: Insecta
- Order: Diptera
- Family: Tabanidae
- Subfamily: Pangoniinae
- Tribe: Scepsidini
- Genus: Scepsis; Walker, 1850

Type species
- Scepsis nivalis Walker, 1850

Genus of flies

Scepsis is a genus of horseflies of the family Tabanidae.

== Species ==
- Scepsis appendiculata (Macquart, 1840)
