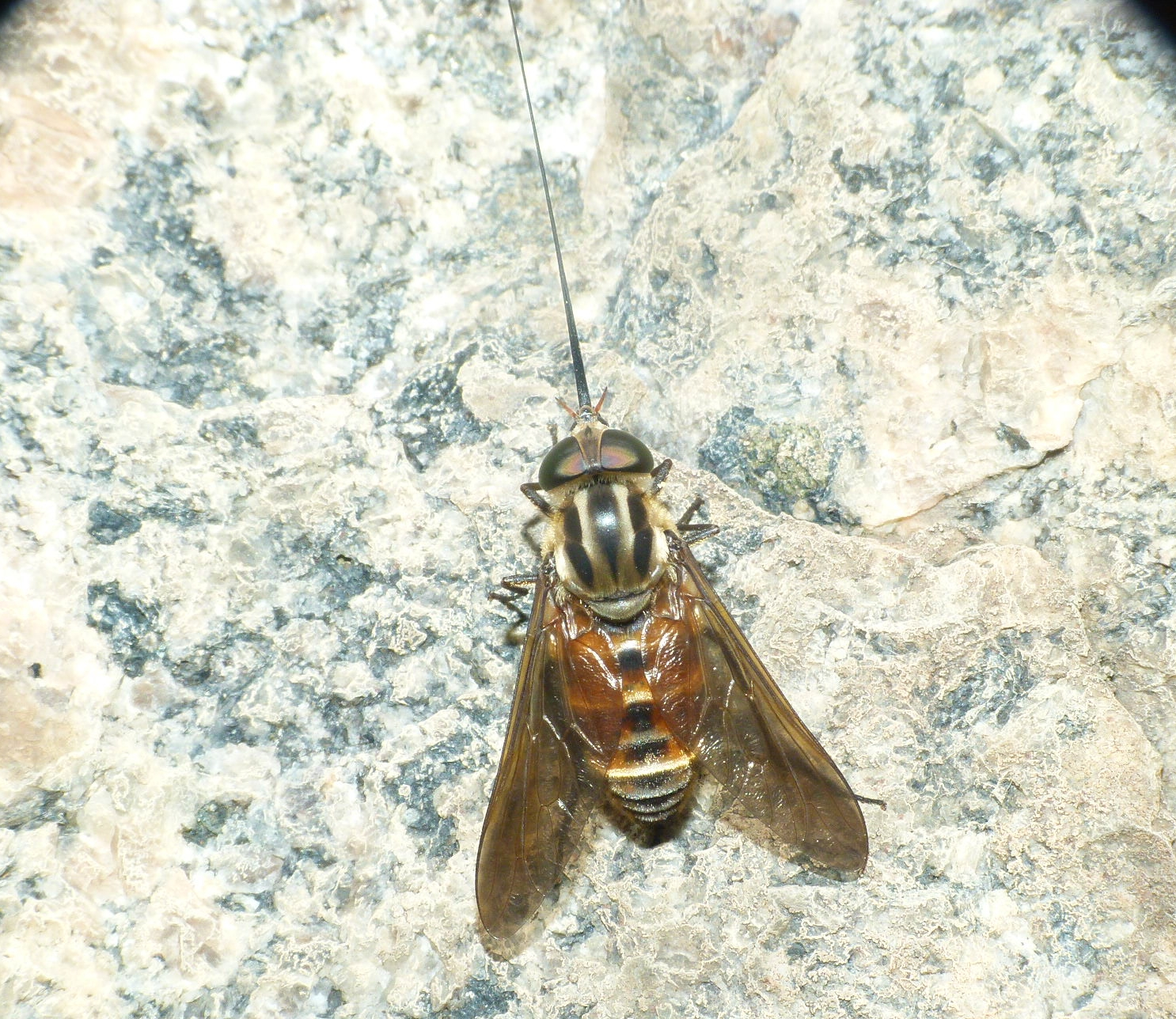
- Philoliche sp., south India

Scientific classification
- Kingdom: Animalia
- Phylum: Arthropoda
- Class: Insecta
- Order: Diptera
- Family: Tabanidae
- Subfamily: Pangoniinae
- Tribe: Philolichini
- Genus: Philoliche; Wiedemann, 1820

Type species
- Tabanus rostratus Linnaeus, 1764

Synonyms
- Nuceria Walker, 1850; Cadicera Macquart, 1855; Corizoneura Rondani, 1863; Philochile Schiner, 1868; Miceria Schiner, 1868; Coryzoneura Ôuchi, 1940

= Philoliche =

Genus of flies

Philoliche is a genus of long-tongued horse-flies found in the Old World. It is placed in the tribe Philolichini. The clade is thought to have originated about 40 million years ago and the 120 or more species are thought to have originated in Africa and expanded into Asia. The plants that they pollinate tend to have elongate corolla tubes.

The species Philoliche longirostris is noted for having the longest extension of the labium, used by males and females to obtain nectar. Females obtain blood from vertebrates using the shorter feeding tube (or syntrophium) that is hidden at the base of the labium.

== Species ==
Species in the genus include:

- Philoliche acutipalpis (Enderlein, 1925)
- Philoliche adjuncta (Walker, 1848)
- Philoliche aethiopica (Thunberg, 1789)
- Philoliche alternans (Macquart, 1855)
- Philoliche amboinensis (Fabricius, 1805)
- Philoliche andrenoides Usher, 1965
- Philoliche angolensis Dias & Serrano, 1967
- Philoliche angulata (Fabricius, 1805)
- Philoliche armigera Oldroyd, 1957
- Philoliche atricornis (Wiedemann, 1821)
- Philoliche auricoma (Austen, 1911)
- Philoliche basalis Oldroyd, 1957
- Philoliche beckeri (Bezzi, 1901)
- Philoliche bivirgulata (Austen, 1937)
- Philoliche brachyrrhyncha (Bigot, 1892)
- Philoliche bracteata (Austen, 1937)
- Philoliche bricchettii (Bezzi, 1892)
- Philoliche brincki Oldroyd, 1957
- Philoliche bubsequa (Austen, 1910)
- Philoliche bukamensis (Bequaert, 1913)
- Philoliche bushmani Oldroyd, 1957
- Philoliche buxtoni Mackerras & Rageau, 1958
- Philoliche caffra (Macquart, 1847)
- Philoliche candidolimbata (Austen, 1911)
- Philoliche carpenteri (Austen, 1920)
- Philoliche chaineyi Dias, 1991
- Philoliche chrysopila (Macquart, 1834)
- Philoliche chrysostigma (Wiedemann, 1828)
- Philoliche coetzeei Dias, 1991
- Philoliche comata (Austen, 1912)
- Philoliche compacta (Austen, 1908)
- Philoliche concitans (Austen, 1910)
- Philoliche crassipalpis (Macquart, 1838)
- Philoliche cunhai Dias, 1955
- Philoliche discincta (Enderlein, 1925)
- Philoliche discors (Austen, 1920)
- Philoliche dissimilis (Ricardo, 1914)
- Philoliche distincta (Ricardo, 1908)
- Philoliche dorsalis (Latreille, 1811)
- Philoliche dubiosa Dias, 1991
- Philoliche elegans (Bigot, 1892)
- Philoliche elongata (Ricardo, 1908)
- Philoliche flava Chainey, 1983
- Philoliche flavipes (Macquart, 1838)
- Philoliche flavitibialis Chainey, 1983
- Philoliche flaviventris Enderlein, 1925
- Philoliche fodiens (Austen, 1908)
- Philoliche formosa (Austen, 1920)
- Philoliche fuscanipennis (Macquart, 1855)
- Philoliche fuscinervis (Austen, 1920)
- Philoliche gravoti (Surcouf, 1908)
- Philoliche gulosa (Wiedemann, 1828)
- Philoliche haroldi Chvála, 1969
- Philoliche hastata (Austen, 1912)
- Philoliche infusca (Austen, 1911)
- Philoliche ingrata Oldroyd, 1957
- Philoliche inornata (Austen, 1911)
- Philoliche irishi Dias, 1991
- Philoliche korosicsomana (Szilády, 1926)
- Philoliche lateralis (Fabricius, 1805)
- Philoliche lautissima (Austen, 1920)
- Philoliche lineatithorax (Austen, 1912)
- Philoliche londti Chainey, 1983
- Philoliche longirostris (Hardwicke, 1823)
- Philoliche lugens (Thunberg, 1789)
- Philoliche macquartiana Chvála, 1969
- Philoliche magrettii (Bezzi, 1901)
- Philoliche makueni Oldroyd, 1957
- Philoliche malindensis Oldroyd, 1957
- Philoliche marrietti Usher, 1967
- Philoliche medialis Oldroyd, 1957
- Philoliche morstatti (Enderlein, 1925)
- Philoliche neavei (Austen, 1910)
- Philoliche neocaledonica (Mégnin, 1878)
- Philoliche nigra (Dias, 1962)
- Philoliche nigripes (Enderlein, 1925)
- Philoliche nitida Usher, 1968
- Philoliche niveibasis (Enderlein, 1937)
- Philoliche nobilis (Wiedemann, 1830)
- Philoliche oldroydi Tendeiro, 1965
- Philoliche omanensis Chainey, 1983
- Philoliche oreophila Usher, 1967
- Philoliche ovambo Oldroyd, 1957
- Philoliche ovazzai Raymond, 1975
- Philoliche palustris Bowden, 1977
- Philoliche pamelae Dias, 1991
- Philoliche pennata Oldroyd, 1957
- Philoliche penrithorum Dias, 1991
- Philoliche peringueyi Chainey, 1983
- Philoliche pollinia Bowden, 1977
- Philoliche praeterita Oldroyd, 1957
- Philoliche quinquemaculata (Austen, 1908)
- Philoliche ricardoae Chainey & Oldroyd, 1980
- Philoliche rodhaini (Bequaert, 1924)
- Philoliche rondani (Bertoloni, 1861)
- Philoliche rostrata (Linnaeus, 1764)
- Philoliche rubiginosa Dias, 1966
- Philoliche rubramarginata (Macquart, 1855)
- Philoliche rueppellii (Jaennicke, 1867)
- Philoliche sagittaria (Surcouf, 1911)
- Philoliche schwetzi (Austen, 1920)
- Philoliche semilivida (Bigot, 1891)
- Philoliche senex (Enderlein, 1937)
- Philoliche silverlocki (Austen, 1912)
- Philoliche similima (Enderlein, 1925)
- Philoliche speciosa (Austen, 1912)
- Philoliche spiloptera (Wiedemann, 1821)
- Philoliche stuckenbergi Chainey, 1983
- Philoliche suavis (Loew, 1858)
- Philoliche subfascia (Walker, 1854)
- Philoliche taprobanes (Walker, 1854)
- Philoliche tendeiroi Dias & Serrano, 1967
- Philoliche tertiomaculata Oldroyd, 1957
- Philoliche tumidifacies (Austen, 1937)
- Philoliche turpis Usher, 1968
- Philoliche varipes (Ricardo, 1911)
- Philoliche verventi Mackerras & Rageau, 1958
- Philoliche virgata (Austen, 1910)
- Philoliche vittata (Thunberg, 1827)
- Philoliche zernyi (Szilády, 1926)
- Philoliche zonata (Walker, 1871)
