= Esenbeckia (fly) =

Scientific classification
- Kingdom: Animalia
- Phylum: Arthropoda
- Class: Insecta
- Order: Diptera
- Family: Tabanidae
- Subfamily: Pangoniinae
- Tribe: Pangoniini
- Genus: Esenbeckia; Rondani, 1863

Type species
- Silvius vulpes Wiedemann, 1828

Synonyms
- Dyspangonia Lutz, 1905; Eisenbeckia Marchand, 1918; Esenbackia Surcouf, 1909; Scapacis Enderlein, 1922

Genus of flies

Esenbeckia is a genus of neotropical horse flies in the family Tabanidae.

== Species ==
- Esenbeckia abata Philip, 1954
- Esenbeckia accincta Wilkerson & Fairchild, 1983
- Esenbeckia affinis Kröber, 1931
- Esenbeckia arcuata (Williston, 1895)
- Esenbeckia auribrunnea Gualdrón-Díaz & Gorayeb, 2020
- Esenbeckia balteata Wilkerson, 1979
- Esenbeckia balzapambana Enderlein, 1925
- Esenbeckia bassleri Wilkerson & Fairchild, 1983
- Esenbeckia bella Philip, 1961
- Esenbeckia biclausa Wilkerson & Fairchild, 1982
- Esenbeckia bitriangulata Lutz & Castro, 1935
- Esenbeckia breedlovei Philip, 1978
- Esenbeckia caustica (Osten Sacken, 1886)
- Esenbeckia chagresensis Fairchild, 1942
- Esenbeckia cisandeana Wilkerson & Fairchild, 1983
- Esenbeckia clari Lutz, 1909
- Esenbeckia curtipalpis Philip, 1954
- Esenbeckia delta (Hine, 1920)
- Esenbeckia deltachi Philip, 1978
- Esenbeckia diaphana (Schiner, 1868)
- Esenbeckia dichroa (Brèthes, 1910)
- Esenbeckia distinguenda Lutz & Castro, 1935
- Esenbeckia downsi Philip, 1954
- Esenbeckia dressleri Wilkerson & Fairchild, 1983
- Esenbeckia dubia Lutz, 1909
- Esenbeckia ecuadorensis Lutz & Castro, 1935
- Esenbeckia enderleini Kröber, 1931
- Esenbeckia erebea Wilkerson & Fairchild, 1983
- Esenbeckia esenbeckii (Wiedemann, 1830)
- Esenbeckia fairchildi Philip, 1943
- Esenbeckia farraginis Fairchild & Wilkerson, 1981
- Esenbeckia fascipennis (Macquart, 1838)
- Esenbeckia fidenodes (Enderlein, 1922)
- Esenbeckia filipalpis (Williston, 1895)
- Esenbeckia divergens Philip, 1969
- Esenbeckia flavescens Lutz, 1909
- Esenbeckia flavohirta (Bellardi, 1859)
- Esenbeckia fuscipennis (Wiedemann, 1828)
- Esenbeckia fenestrata Lutz, 1909
- Esenbeckia fuscipes Enderlein, 1925
- Esenbeckia geminorum Fairchild & Wilkerson, 1981
- Esenbeckia gertschi Philip, 1954
- Esenbeckia gracilipalpis Chainey & Hall, 1996
- Esenbeckia gracilis Kröber, 1931
- Esenbeckia griseipleura Chainey & Hall, 1996
- Esenbeckia hirsutipalpus Wilkerson & Fairchild, 1982
- Esenbeckia hoguei Philip, 1973
- Esenbeckia illota (Williston, 1901)
- Esenbeckia osornoi Fairchild, 1942
- Esenbeckia planaltina Fairchild, 1971
- Esenbeckia incerta (Bellardi, 1859)
- Esenbeckia incisuralis (Say, 1823)
- Esenbeckia tinkhami Philip, 1954
- Esenbeckia infrataeniata Lutz & Castro, 1935
- Esenbeckia insignis Kröber, 1931
- Esenbeckia jalisco Burger, 1999
- Esenbeckia keelifera Philip, 1973
- Esenbeckia laticlava Wilkerson & Fairchild, 1983
- Esenbeckia leechi Philip, 1978
- Esenbeckia lugubris (Macquart, 1838)
- Esenbeckia matogrossensis Lutz, 1911
- Esenbeckia media Burger, 1999
- Esenbeckia mejiai Fairchild, 1942
- Esenbeckia melanogaster Lutz & Castro, 1935
- Esenbeckia melanopa (Hine, 1920)
- Esenbeckia mexicana Philip, 1954
- Esenbeckia micheneri (Philip, 1954)
- Esenbeckia micheneri Philip, 1954
- Esenbeckia minor Kröber, 1931
- Esenbeckia minuscula Wilkerson, 1979
- Esenbeckia neglecta Lutz, 1911
- Esenbeckia nigricorpus Lutz, 1909
- Esenbeckia nigriventris Kröber, 1931
- Esenbeckia nigronotata (Macquart, 1850)
- Esenbeckia nigrovillosa Kröber, 1931
- Esenbeckia nitens Philip, 1973
- Esenbeckia notabilis (Walker, 1850)
- Esenbeckia obscurithorax Lutz & Castro, 1935
- Esenbeckia painteri Philip, 1968
- Esenbeckia parishi (Hine, 1920)
- Esenbeckia pavida (Williston, 1901)
- Esenbeckia pechumani Wilkerson & Fairchild, 1983
- Esenbeckia perspicua Wilkerson & Fairchild, 1983
- Esenbeckia peruviana Burger, 1999
- Esenbeckia planiventris (Macquart, 1850)
- Esenbeckia potrix Philip, 1969
- Esenbeckia prasiniventris (Macquart, 1846)
- Esenbeckia punctiventer Fairchild & Wilkerson, 1981
- Esenbeckia reinburgi Surcouf, 1919
- Esenbeckia rostrum Philip, 1943
- Esenbeckia saussurei (Bellardi, 1859)
- Esenbeckia schlingeri Philip, 1960
- Esenbeckia schusteri Philip, 1973
- Esenbeckia scionodes Philip, 1973
- Esenbeckia semiflava (Wiedemann, 1830)
- Esenbeckia seminuda (Coquillett, 1902)
- Esenbeckia subguttata Fairchild, 1964
- Esenbeckia subvaria (Walker, 1848)
- Esenbeckia suturalis (Rondani, 1848)
- Esenbeckia tepicana (Townsend, 1912)
- Esenbeckia testaceiventris (Macquart, 1848)
- Esenbeckia tetragoniphora Lutz & Castro, 1935
- Esenbeckia tigrina Wilkerson, 1979
- Esenbeckia tinctipennis Kröber, 1931
- Esenbeckia translucens (Macquart, 1846)
- Esenbeckia triangularis Philip, 1954
- Esenbeckia tristis Kröber, 1931
- Esenbeckia tucumana Brèthes, 1910
- Esenbeckia vulpes (Wiedemann, 1828)
- Esenbeckia weemsi Philip, 1966
- Esenbeckia wiedemanni (Bellardi, 1859)
- Esenbeckia wygodzinskyi Wilkerson & Fairchild, 1983
- Esenbeckia xanthoskela Wilkerson & Fairchild, 1983
- Esenbeckia yepocapa Fairchild, 1951
