= Ian Murray Mackerras =

Australian zoologist

Ian Murray Mackerras (19 September 1898 – 21 March 1980) was an Australian zoologist.

Mackerras was born in Balclutha, New Zealand to James Murray Mackerras, and Elizabeth Mary (née Creagh), both farmers. His parents separated and Ian and brother Alan lived with their mother in Sydney. Ian was educated at Sydney Grammar School, matriculating in 1915.

On 17 December 1915 Mackerras enlisted in the Australian Imperial Force after advancing his age. He was designated laboratory attendant in IHS Karoola on 19 December 1915. He later saw action in France and was gassed on 28 May 1918. He returned to Australia, arriving in Melbourne on 13 April 1919.

Mackerras studied medicine at the University of Sydney in April 1919 but soon switched to zoology. In March 1924 Mackerras graduated MB, ChM, BSc, with First Class Honours in Zoology, the University Medal in Zoology, and shared the John Coutts Scholarship.

Mackerras was awarded the Linnean Macleay Fellowship in Zoology in 1925. He wrote papers on the flies Nemestrinidae and Mydaidae. From January 1927 he worked at the Bureau of Microbiology of the New South Wales Department of Public Health.

In 1928 the newly founded Council for Scientific and Industrial Research was looking for entomologists. Mackerras joined the new organisation on 1 December 1928 and soon moved his family to Canberra. He worked on the buffalo fly and sheep blow-fly problems.

Mackerras served in the Middle East and Guinea in World War II, advising on sanitation and malaria.

On 2 June 1947 Mackerras became the first Director of the newly established Queensland Institute of Medical Research (QIMR) in Brisbane. One of his students was June Halliday.

In 1950 Mackerras was awarded the Clarke Medal by the Royal Society of New South Wales; was elected a fellow of the Australian Academy of Science at its first election in 1954, and served on its Council from 1955 to 1957; he and wife Josephine were both appointed as Research Fellows in the Division of Entomology, in the Commonwealth Scientific and Industrial Research Organisation in August 1961.

In 1961 he was awarded the Mueller Medal by the Australian and New Zealand Association for the Advancement of Science.

Mackerras edited a textbook, The Insects of Australia; it includes some of his own drawings.

Awards
Preceded by Herman Rupp	Clarke Medal; 1950	Succeeded by Frank Leslie Stillwell
