= Mabel Josephine Mackerras =

Australian zoologist, entomologist and parasitologist

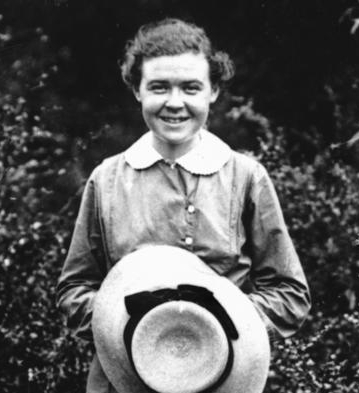
- Born: 7 August 1896
- Died: 8 October 1971 (aged 75)

Mabel Josephine (Jo) Mackerras (née Bancroft) (7 August 1896 – 8 October 1971) was an Australian zoologist, entomologist and parasitologist. Her research and life's work contributed to entomology, veterinary medicine and medical science. Throughout her life she held a wide range of positions and duties that included Army medical officer, entomologist, medical scientist, and parasitologist. Mackerras was a major during WWII and served in the Army Malaria Research Unit. In an application for King's Birthday Honours her work earned the citation,: "few women can have made a greater contribution to the Allied war effort".

== Personal life ==
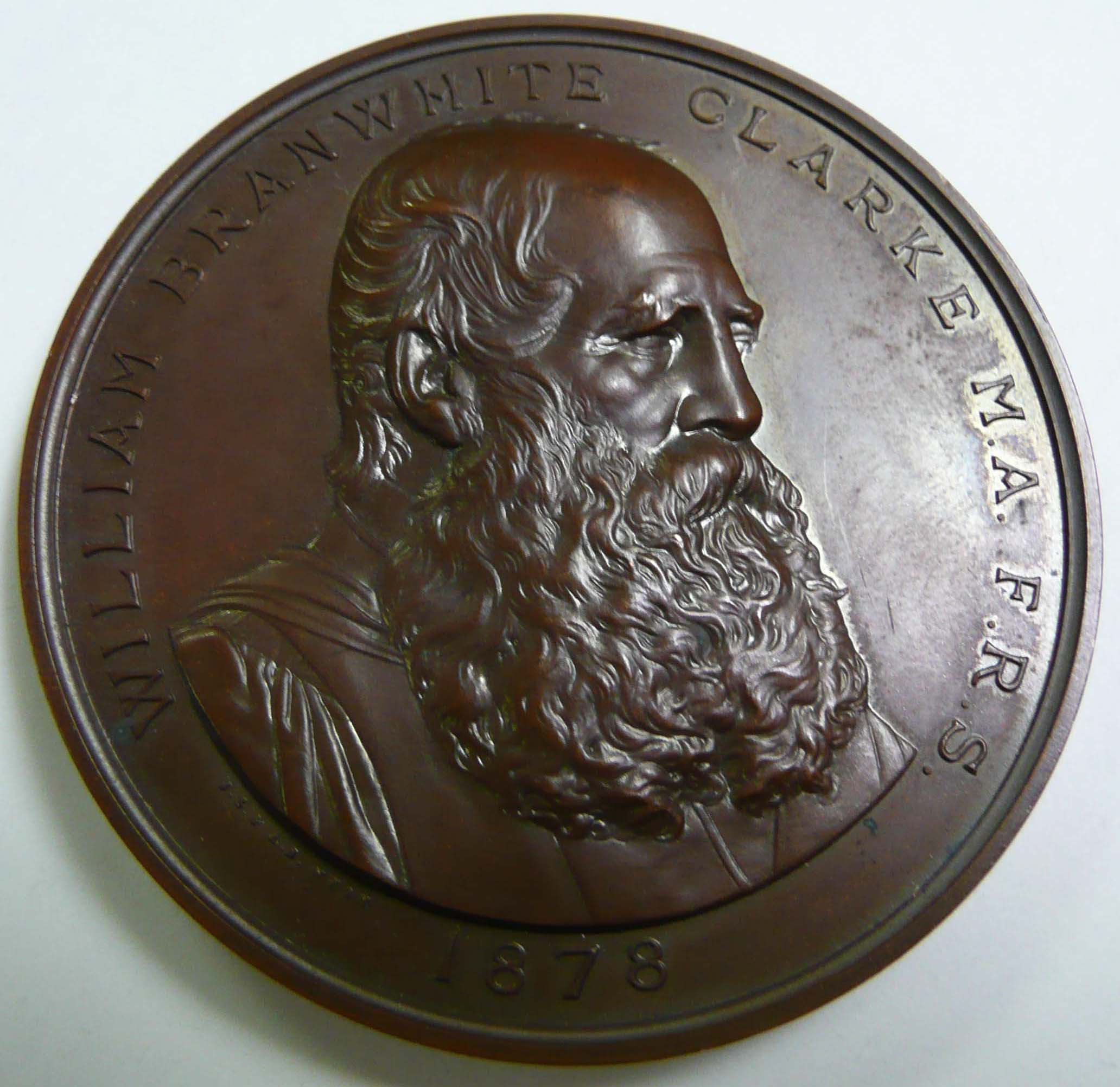
Clarke Medal

Mackerras was born as Mabel Josephine Bancroft on 7 August 1896 at Deception Bay, Caboolture District, Queensland, elder child of Thomas Lane Bancroft, an English-born medical practitioner, and his wife Cecilia Mary, née Jones from Brisbane. She was the granddaughter of Joseph Bancroft. She married Ian Murray Mackerras on 5 April 1924 at Grosvenor Flat, Eidsvold, Queensland (her parents' home).

On 8 October 1971, Mackerras of Ridley Street, Turner and member of Council for Scientific and Industrial Research, Division of Entomology died in Canberra. She was buried in the Canberra cemetery. In WWII she held the rank of major and served in the Malaria Control Unit of the Australian Armed Forces. She was survived by her husband and only son.

Josephine was awarded the Clarke Medal in 1965. In 1966, she was elected a fellow of the Australian Society of Parasitology.

== Education ==
She was educated at home by her mother and found delight in the study of plants, animals and insects. She assisted her father in his research projects at the Deception Bay residence. Mackerras attended the Brisbane Girls Grammar School and was awarded prizes in mathematics. She enrolled in the University of Queensland and graduated in 1918 with B.Sc., and in 1930 with M.Sc. From 1918 to 1920, she held the Walter and Eliza Hall fellowship in enomic biology. Thomas Harvey Johnston was her honours academic advisor and she collaborated with Johnston in research that led to several important joint publications. In 1924, she completed the M.B. at the University of Sydney. During her time at the University of Sydney, she met Ian Murray Mackerras, her future husband. The young couple enjoyed sailing and fishing during the weekend breaks, and would not feast on the catch until thorough laboratory analysis of the fish blood for haematozoa.

== Early career ==
The first paper the couple published as a team, recorded the blood parasites of Australian marine fish. The couple was married in an Anglican service on 5 April 1924 at Grosvenor Flat, Eidsvold, Queensland. The team of Mackerras and Mackerras had a noteworthy husband-and-wife partnership in Australian science history.

Mackerras completed residency at the Royal Prince Alfred Hospital in Sydney. She then opened a small private practice and still found time for a part-time appointment at the Rachel Forster Hospital for Women and Children. In 1926, when her son was born, she placed her professional career on hold. In 1930, Mackerras joined the unit led by her husband, as assistant entomologist at the Council for Scientific and Industrial Research's division of economic entomology in Canberra . Her research on blowfly infestation and ephemeral fever led to several individual and joint publications with husband Ian Mackerras and Frank Macfarlane Burnet. The unit was a successful research team that increased the knowledge of the control of sheep blowfly, buffalo fly, tick fever, and ephemeral fever in cattle. After WWII broke out, on 7 February 1942, Mackerras joined the Australian Army Medical Corps as captain and was stationed in the Sydney area.

== Malaria research ==
By June 1943, malaria had a significant impact on the troops in the Southwest Pacific Area. To seek a solution to this burgeoning problem affecting the troops, Mackerras, Hugh Ward and Bill Keogh proposed an organization that would focus on the scientific investigation of the disease. In 1943, the Land Headquarters Medical Research Unit was established under (Sir) Neil Hamilton Fairley at Cairns, Queensland. From 1943, Mackerras was attached to the Medical Research Unit as entomologist and promoted to major in March 1944. She actively maintained a colony of infected mosquitoes that were utilized on volunteers for medical testing. Her work proved beneficial to reduce the incidence of infection in the armed forces, and delivered a scientific basis for studying the effects of pharmaceutical drugs on the malarial parasite. In March 1946, the Medical Research Unit was disbanded and she collaborated with colleagues to publish several important papers on the work with malaria.

== Post WWII ==
In February 1946, after the troops were demobilized, Ian and Jo Mackerras resumed their work with the Council for Scientific and Industrial Research. In April 1946, the couple moved to the Yeerongpilly laboratories in Brisbane. At the Yeerongpilly laboratories, Ian initiated studies on the control of the cattle tick and Jo commenced work on the Simuliidae (blackflies).

In September 1947, Mackerras obtained a position at the Q.I.M.R. as senior parasitologist. The next endeavor that captured her attention and became her major contribution to scientific knowledge came from her study of the parasites of Australian mammals. She revealed and explained the life history of the rat lungworm. This species would prove to be the cause of eosinophilic meningitis in the indigenous people of the Pacific islands.

A parasitic nematode species of lungworm, Angiostrongylus Mackerrasae, was named in her honor. The Mackerras husband and wife team also focused their efforts on the examination of the role of cockroaches in the transmission of salmonella, especially to children. The Mackerras couple collaborated on definitive works on the haematozoan parasites of Australian birds, frogs and fishes and produced several papers in this area. Another pursuit the couple explored dealt with parasites in several Australian marsupials.

In 1961, Mackerras retired from the Q.I.M.R. She returned to the Commonwealth Scientific and Industrial Research Organization at Canberra as research fellow in the division of entomology. Mackerras would again study the cockroach and contributed a chapter on the subject in her husband's book, The Insects of Australia.

== Professional service ==
- (Royal) College of Pathologists of Australia (Australasia), member, 1957; then fellow, date???
- Royal Society of Queensland, member
- Great Barrier Reef Committee, member
- Heron Island Research Station, helped establish
- Queensland Medical Women's Society, president
- Women Graduates' Association, president
- Canberra Aero Club, founding member, pilot

== Awards and honours ==
- Walter and Eliza Hall fellowship in economic biology, University of Queensland, 1918–1920
- W.B. Clarke Medal, Royal Society of New South Wales, 1965
- Australian Society of Parasitology, fellow, 1966
- University of Queensland, honorary doctorate of science, 1967
- Portrait by Nora Heysen is held by the Australian War Memorial, Canberra

Awards
| Preceded by Joyce Winifred Vickery | Clarke Medal; 1965 | Succeeded by Dorothy Hill |

== Publications ==
=== Thomas Harvey Johnston ===
- Johnston, T. H., & Bancroft, M. J. (1918). A parasite, Myxobolus hylae sp. nov. of the reproductive organs of the golden swamp frog, Hyla aurea. Australian Zoology. 1: 171–175.
- Johnston, T. H., & Bancroft, M. J. (1918). A parasite Myxobolus hylae n. sp. of the reproductive organs of the golden swamp frog, Hyla aurea. JR Soc. NSW. 43: 171–175.
- Johnston, T. H., & Bancroft, M. J. (1918). Tick resistant cattle. Queensland Agricultural Journal. 171–172.
- Johnston, T., & Bancroft, M. (1918). Tick-resistance of Cattle. Agric. Gaz. NSW. 29(5): 319–320.
- Johnston, T., & Bancroft, M. J. (1919). Report on Mr. Munro Hull's Claims regarding Tick-resisting Cattle. Queensland Agricultural Journal. 11(1): 31–35.
- Johnston, T. H., & Bancroft, M. J. (1919). Some new sporozoan parasites of Queensland freshwater fish. In Journal and Proceedings of the Royal Society of New South Wales. (52): 520–528.
- Johnston, T. H., & Bancroft, M. J. (1920). The Cattle Worm-Nodule Parasite. Science and Industry. 2(5): 315–316.
- Johnston, T. H., & Bancroft, M. J. (January 1920). The Life Histories of Musca australis Macq., and M. vetustissima Walker. In Proceedings of the Royal Society of Queensland. 31(12): 181–203. Brisbane.
- Johnston, T. H., & Bancroft, M. J. (June 1920). The Life History of Habronema in Relation to Musca domestica and Native Flies in Queensland. In Proceedings of the Royal Society of Queensland. 32(5): 61–88. Brisbane.
- Johnston, T. H., & Bancroft, M. J. (1920). Notes on the Biology of some Queensland Flies. Memoirs of the Queensland Museum. 7(1): 31–43.
- Johnston, T. H., & Bancroft, M. J. (September 1920). Notes on the Life History of certain, Queensland Tabanid Flies. In Proceedings of the Royal Society of Queensland. 32(10): 125–131. Brisbane.
- Johnston, T. H., & Bancroft, M. J. (1921). The Freshwater Fish Epidemics in Queensland Rivers. Proceedings of the Royal Society of Queensland. Royal Society of Queensland.

=== 1925 – 1933 ===
- Mackerras, I. M., & Mackerras, M. J. (1925). The haematozoa of Australian marine teleostei. In Proceedings of the Linnean Society of New South Wales. (Vol. 50, pp. 359–366).
- Mackerras, M. J. (1933). Observations on the life-histories, nutritional requirements and fecundity of blowflies. Bulletin of Entomological Research. 24(03): 353–362.
- Mackerras, M. J., & Freney, M. R. (1933). Observations on the nutrition of maggots of Australian blow-flies. Journal of Experimental Biology. 10(3): 237–246.
- Mackerras, M. J. (1933). Note on the occurrence of a white-eyed mutant race of Lucilia cuprina Wied. Aust. Journal of Experimental Biology. Med. Sci. 11, 45–47.

=== 1935 – 1938 ===
- Freney, M. R., Mackerras, I. M., & Mackerras, M. J. (1935). A note on new dressings for fly-struck sheep. Journal of the Council for Scientific and Industrial Research. Australia. 8: 161, 168.
- Freney, M., Mackerras, I., & Mackerras, M. (1935). A promising new Blowfly Dressing. Glycerine and Boric Acid. Agric. Gaz. NSW. 46(pt. 7).
- Freney, M., Mackerras, I., & Mackerras, M. (1935). Glycero-Boric Blowfly Dressing. Dep. Agrie. Victoria. 33(7).
- Freney, M. R., Mackerras, I. M., & Mackerras, M. J. (1936). Further observations on glycerine-boric acid dressings for fly-struck sheep. Journal of the Council for Scientific and Industrial Research, Australia. 9: 11–18.
- Mackerras, M. J. (1938). Losses due to the sheep blowfly. Journal of the Council for Scientific and Industrial Research. 11: 97–102.

=== 1940 – 1947 ===
- Mackerras, I., Mackerras, M., & Burnet, Frank Macfarlane. (1940). Experimental Studies of Ephemeral Fever in Australian Cattle. Bulletin of the Council for Scientific and Industrial Research. Australia. (136).
- Mackerras, I. M., Mackerras, M. J., & Mulhearn, C. R. (1942). Attempted transmission of Anaplasma marginale Theiler by biting-flies. CSIR, Australia. 15: 37–54.
- Mackerras, I. M., & Mackerras, M. J. (1944). Sheep blowfly investigations: the attractiveness of sheep for Lucilia cuprina. Council for Scientific and Industrial Research.
- Mackerras, M. J., & Ercole, Q. N. (1947). Observations on the action of paludrine on malarial parasites. Transactions of the Royal Society of Tropical Medicine and Hygiene. 41(3): 365–376.
- Mackerras, M. J., & Roberts, F. (1947). Experimental malarial infections in Australasian anophelines. Annals of tropical medicine and parasitology. 41(3–4): 329.

=== 1948 – 1949 ===
- Mackerras, M. J., & Mackerras, I. M. (1948). Salmonella Infections in Australian Cockroaches. Australian Journal of Science. 10(4).
- Mackerras, M. J., & Ercole, Q. N. (1948). Observations on the development of human malarial parasites in the mosquito; morphological changes. The Australian journal of experimental biology and medical science. 26(Pt 5): 439–447.
- Mackerras, M., & Ercole, Q. (1948). Observations on the development of human malarial parasites in the mosquito; factors influencing infection. The Australian journal of experimental biology and medical science. 26(Pt 5): 449–458.
- Mackerras, M. J., & Ercole, Q. N. (1948). Observations on the life-cycle of Plasmodium malariae. The Australian journal of experimental biology and medical science. 26(Pt. 6): 515–519.
- Mackerras, I. M., & Mackerras, M. J. (1949). An epidemic of infantile gastro-enteritis in Queensland caused by Salmonella bovis-morbificans (Basenau). Journal of Hygiene. 47(02): 166–181.
- Mackerras, M. J., & Ercole, Q. N. (1949). Some observations on the action of quinine, atebrin, and plasmoquine on Plasmodium vivax. Transactions of the Royal Society of Tropical Medicine and Hygiene. 42(5): 443–454.
- Mackerras, M. J., & Ercole, Q. N. (1949). Observations on the action of quinine, atebrin and plasmoquine on the gametocytes of Plasmodium falciparum. Transactions of the Royal Society of Tropical Medicine and Hygiene. 42(5): 455–463.
- Mackerras, I. M., & Mackerras, M. J. (1949). Revisional Notes on Australasian Simuliidae (Diptera). In Proceedings of the Linnean Society of New South Wales. 73(5–6): 372–405. Sydney.
- Mackerras, M. J., & Lemerle, T. H. (1949). Laboratory Breeding of Anopheles Punctulatus Punctulatus, Dönitz. Bulletin of entomological research. 40(01): 27–41.
- Mackerras, I. M., & Mackerras, M. J. (1949). The bacteriological diagnosis of salmonella infections. The Medical Journal of Australia. 1(1): 1. (First article in first issue of Journal).
- Mackerras, M. J., & Mackerras, I. M. (1949). The prevention of gastroenteritis in infants. Med. J. Austral. 1: 477.

=== 1950 – 1955 ===
- Mackerras, M. J., & Mackerras, I. M. (1950). Notes on Australasian Simuliidae (Diptera). II. In Proceedings of the Linnean Society of New South Wales. 75(3–4): 167–187. Sydney.
- Mackerras, I. M., & Mackerras, M. J. (1951). Apistomyia collini Bezzi (Diptera, Blepharoceridae) in North Queensland. In Proceedings of the Royal Society of Queensland. (62): 29–32.
- Mackerras, M. J. (1953). Lizard filaria: transmission by mosquitoes of Oswaldofilaria chlamydosauri (Breinl)(Nematoda: Filarioidea). Parasitology. 43(1–2): 1–3.
- Mackerras, I. M., Mackerras, M. J., & Sandars, D. F. (1953). Parasites of the bandicoot, Isoodon obesulus. In Proceedings of the Royal Society of Queensland. (Vol. 63, pp. 61–63).
- Mackerras, M. J., & Sandars, D. F. (1953). Two new metastrongyle lung-worms from Australian marsupials. In Proceedings of the Royal Society of Queensland. (63): 71–76.
- Mackerras, I. M., & Mackerras, M. J. (1953). Problems of parasitology and entomology in Australia. Australian Journal of Science. (15): 185–189.
- Mackerras, M. J. (1953). Suppression of Plasmodium berghei in Rats on a Milk Diet. Australian J. Science. 16(1): 24–7.
- Mackerras, I. M., & Mackerras, M. J. (1953). A new species of Pelecorhynchus (Diptera, Tabanoidea) from the Dorrigo Plateau, New South Wales. In Proceedings of the Linnean Society of New South Wales. (78): 38–40.
- Mackerras, M. J. (1954). Two new species of Dipetalonema (Nematoda, Filarioidea) from Australian marsupials. In Proceedings of the Royal Society of Queensland. (64): 51–56.
- MacKerras, M. J., & Sandars, D. F. (1954). Life-history of the rat lung-worm and its migration through the brain of its host. Nature. 173: 956–957.
- Mackerras, M. J., & Sandars, D. F. (1954). Malaria in the Torres Straits Islands. Technical paper. South Pacific Commission. (68).
- Mackerras, M. J. (1955). A new lung-worm from Australian marsupials. In Proceedings of the Royal Society of Queensland. (66): 77–81.
- Mackerras, M. J., & Sandars, D. F. (1955). The life history of the rat lung-worm, Angiostrongylus cantonensis (Chen)(Nematoda: Metastrongylidae). Australian Journal of Zoology. 3(1): 1–21.

=== 1957 – 1959 ===
- Mackerras, M. J. (1957). Observations on the life history of the cat Lungworm. Aelurostrongylus abstrusus (Railliet, 1898)(Nematoda: Metastrongylidae). Australian Journal of Zoology. 5(2): 188–195.
- Mackerras, M. J. (1957). Capttlaria in the spleen of the rat (Nematoda: Trichuroidea). Australian Journal of Science. 19(6).
- Mackerras, M. J. (1958). Catalogue of Australian mammals and their recorded internal parasites. I–IV. In Proceedings of the Linnean Society of New South Wales. 83(2): 101–160.
- Mackerras, M. J. (1958). The Decline of Filariasis in Queensland. Medical Journal of Australia. 1(21): 702–4.
- Lee, P. E., & Mackerras, M. J. (1958). Lungworm and MVE infection. Queensland Inst. Med. Research Thirteenth Annual Report. 11.
- Mackerras, M. J. (1959). Strongyloides and parastrongyloides (Nematoda: Rhabdiasoidea) in Australian Marsupials. Australian Journal of Zoology. 7(2): 87–104.

=== 1960 – 1963 ===
- Mackerras, M. J., & Smith, R. H. (1960). Breeding the short-nosed Bandicoot, Isoodon macrourus (Gould), in captivity. Australian Journal of Zoology. 8(3): 371–382.
- Mackerras, I. M., & Mackerras, M. J. (1960). Taxonomy of the common short-nosed marsupial bandicoot in eastern Queensland. Australian Journal of Science. 23(2): 51–52.
- Mackerras, M., & Mackerras, I. (1960). The haematozoa of Australian birds. Australian J. Zool. (8): 226–260.
- Doherty, R. L., Carley, J. G., Mackerras, M. J., Trevethan, P., & Marks, E. N. (1961). Isolation of Murray Valley encephalitis and other viruses from mosquitoes in north Queensland. Australian Journal of Science, 23(9), 302–303.
- Mackerras, M. J. (1961). The haematozoa of Australian reptiles. Australian Journal of Zoology. 9(1): 61–122.
- Mackerras, M. J., & Mackerras, I. M. (1961). The haematozoa of Australian frogs and fish. Australian Journal of Zoology. 9(1): 123–139.
- Mackerras, M. J. (1961). A promising new drug for the elimination of hookworms. The Medical Journal of Australia, 48, 261.
- Mackerras, M. J. (1962). The life of a Hepatozoon (Sporozoa: Adeleidea) of varanid Lizards in Australia. Australian Journal of Zoology, 10(1), 35–44.
- Mackerras, M. J. (1962). Filarial parasites (Nematoda: Filarioidea) of Australian animals. Australian Journal of Zoology, 10(3), 400–457.
- Doherty, R. L., Carley, J. G., Mackerras, M. J., & Marks, E. N. (1963). Studies of arthropod-borne virus infections in Queensland. III. Isolation and characterization of virus strains from wild-caught mosquitoes in North Queensland. The Australian journal of experimental biology and medical science, 41, 17.

=== 1965 – 1970 ===
- McKittricks, F. A., & Mackerras, M. J. (1965). Phyletic relationships within the Blattidae. Annals of the entomological Society of America, 58(2), 224–230.
- Mackerras, M. J. (1965). Australian blattidae (Blattodea). 1. General remarks, and revision of the genus Polyzosteria burmeister. Australian Journal of Zoology, 13(5), 841–882.
- Mackerras, M. J. (1965). Australian blattidae (Blattodea). 2. Revision of the genus Euzosteria Shelford. Australian Journal of Zoology, 13(5), 883–902.
- Mackerras, M. J. (1965). Australian blattidae (Blattodea). 3. Revision of the genera Zonioploca Stal and Eppertia Shaw. Australian Journal of Zoology, 13(5), 903–928.
- Mackerras, M. J. (1966). Australian Blattidae (Blattodae) IV. Megazosteria, gen. nov., and revision of the genus Desmozosteria Shelford. Australian Journal of Zoology, 14(2), 305–334.
- Mackerras, M. J. (1966). Australian Blattidae (Blattodae) V. Revision of the genera Anamesia Tepper and Pseudolampra Tepper. Australian Journal of Zoology, 14(2), 335–363.
- Mackerras, M. J. (1967). Australian Blattidae (Blattodea) VI. Revision of the genus Cosmozosteria Stal. Australian Journal of Zoology, 15(3), 593–618.
- Mackerras, M. J. (1967). Australian Blattidae (Blattodea) VII. The Platyzosteria group; general remarks and revision of the subgenera Platyzosteria Brunner and Leptozosteria Tepper. Australian Journal of Zoology, 15(6), 1207–1298.
- Mackerras, M. J. (1967). Australian Blattidae (Blattodea)—VIII. The Platyzosteria group. The subgenus Melanozosteria. Aust. J. Zool. 16(2): 237–331.
- Mackerras, M. J. (1968). Australian Blattidae (Blattodea) IX. Revision of the Polyzosteriinae tribe Methanini, Tryonicinae, and Blattinae. Australian Journal of Zoology, 16(3), 511–575.
- Mackerras, M. J. (1967). A blind cockroach from caves in the Nullarbor Plain (Blattodea: Blattellidae). Australian Journal of Entomology. 6(1): 39–44.
- Mackerras, M. J. (1968). Neolaxta monteithi, gen. et sp. n. from eastern Australia (Blattodea: Blaberidae). Australian Journal of Entomology, 7(2), 143–146.
- Mackerras, M. J. (1968). Polyphagidae (Blattodea) from eastern Australia. Australian Journal of Entomology, 7(2), 147–154.
- Mackerras, M. J. (1969). Bancroft, Joseph (1836–1894). Australian dictionary of biography, 3, 1851–1890.
- Mackerras, M. J. (1970). Blattodea (cockroaches). Insects of Australia. CSIRO. Australia.

Awards
| Preceded by Joyce Winifred Vickery | Clarke Medal; 1965 | Succeeded by Dorothy Hill |
