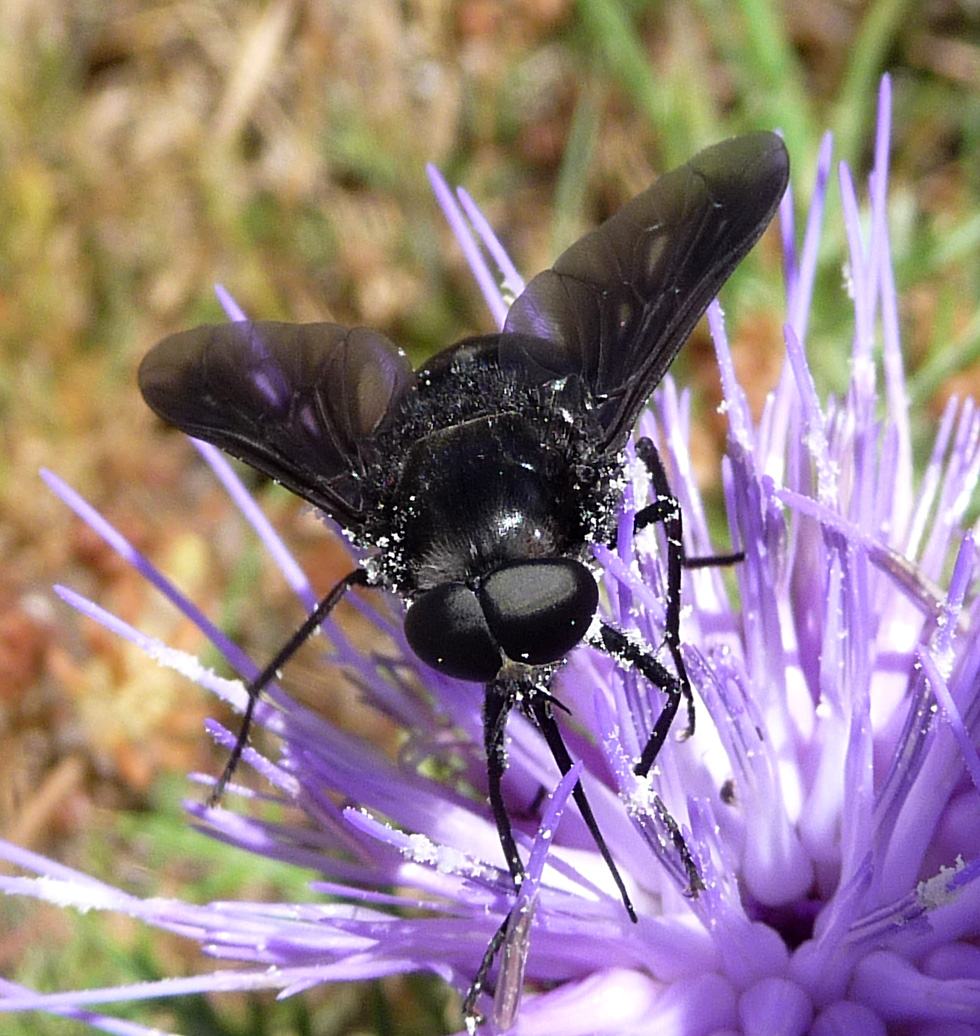
- Pangonius sp.

Scientific classification
- Kingdom: Animalia
- Phylum: Arthropoda
- Clade: Pancrustacea
- Class: Insecta
- Order: Diptera
- Infraorder: Tabanomorpha
- Superfamily: Tabanoidea
- Family: Tabanidae
- Subfamily: Pangoniinae; Loew, 1860

Tribes
- Braunsiomyiini; Goniopsini; Mycteromyiini; Pangoniini; Philolichini; Scionini; Scepsidini

= Pangoniinae =

Subfamily of flies

Pangoniinae is a subfamily of horse-flies in the order Diptera, containing at seven tribes and over 40 genera.

Insects in this subfamily are distinguished from other Tabanidae by possession of ocelli and the antennal flagellum usually has eight rings.

== Tribes and genera ==
The following listing of genera and tribes is based on Josef Moucha's Synoptic Catalogue, with tribe Scionini revised as in Lessard (2014) with the creation of two new tribes, Goniopsini and Mycteromyiini.

=== Braunsiomyiini ===
Tribe Braunsiomyiini

- Braunsiomyia

=== Goniopsini ===
Tribe Goniopsini Lessard, 2014

- Goniops Aldrich, 1892

=== Mycteromyiini ===
Tribe Mycteromyiini Lessard, 2014

- Caenopangonia Kröber, 1930

=== Pangoniini ===
Tribe Pangoniini

- Archeomyotes Philip & Coscarón, 1971
- Apatolestes Williston, 1885
- Asaphomyia Stone, 1953
- Austromyans Philip & Coscarón, 1971
- Austroplex Mackerras, 1955
- Brennania Philip, 1941
- Caenoprosopon Ricardo, 1915
- Ectenopsis Macquart, 1838
- Esenbeckia Rondani, 1863
- Fairchildimyia Philip & Coscarón, 1971
- Nagatomyia Murdoch & Takashasi, 1961
- Pangonius Latreille, 1802
- Pegasomyia Burger, 1985
- Pilimas Brennan, 1941
- Protodasyapha Enderlein, 1922
- Protosilvius Enderlein, 1922
- Stonemyia Brennan, 1935
- Stuckenbergina Oldroyd, 1962
- Therevopangonia Mackerras, 1955
- Veprius Rondani, 1863
- Zophina Philip, 1954

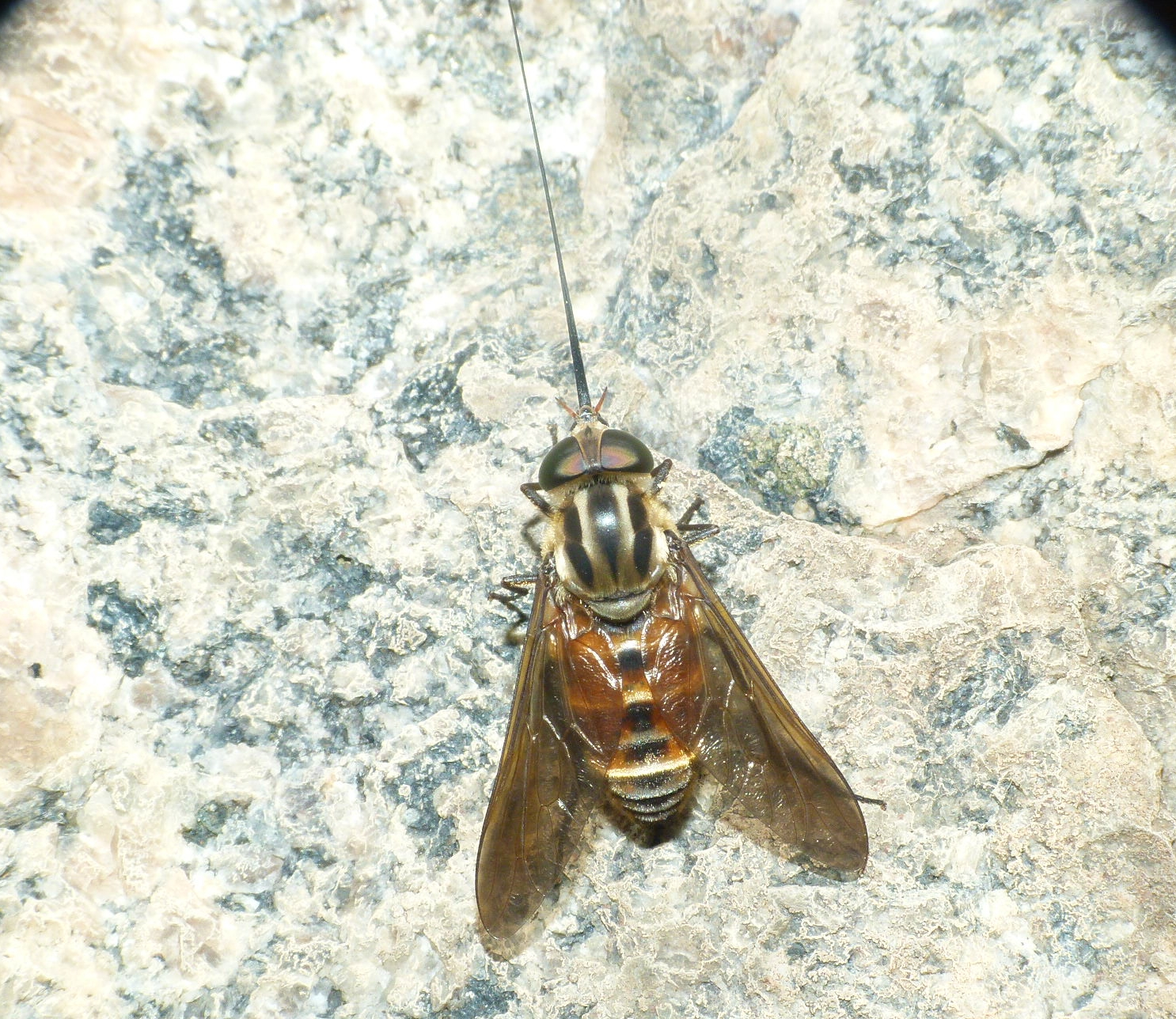
Philoliche sp., India

=== Philolichini ===
Tribe Philolichini

- Philoliche Wiedemann, 1920

=== Scionini ===
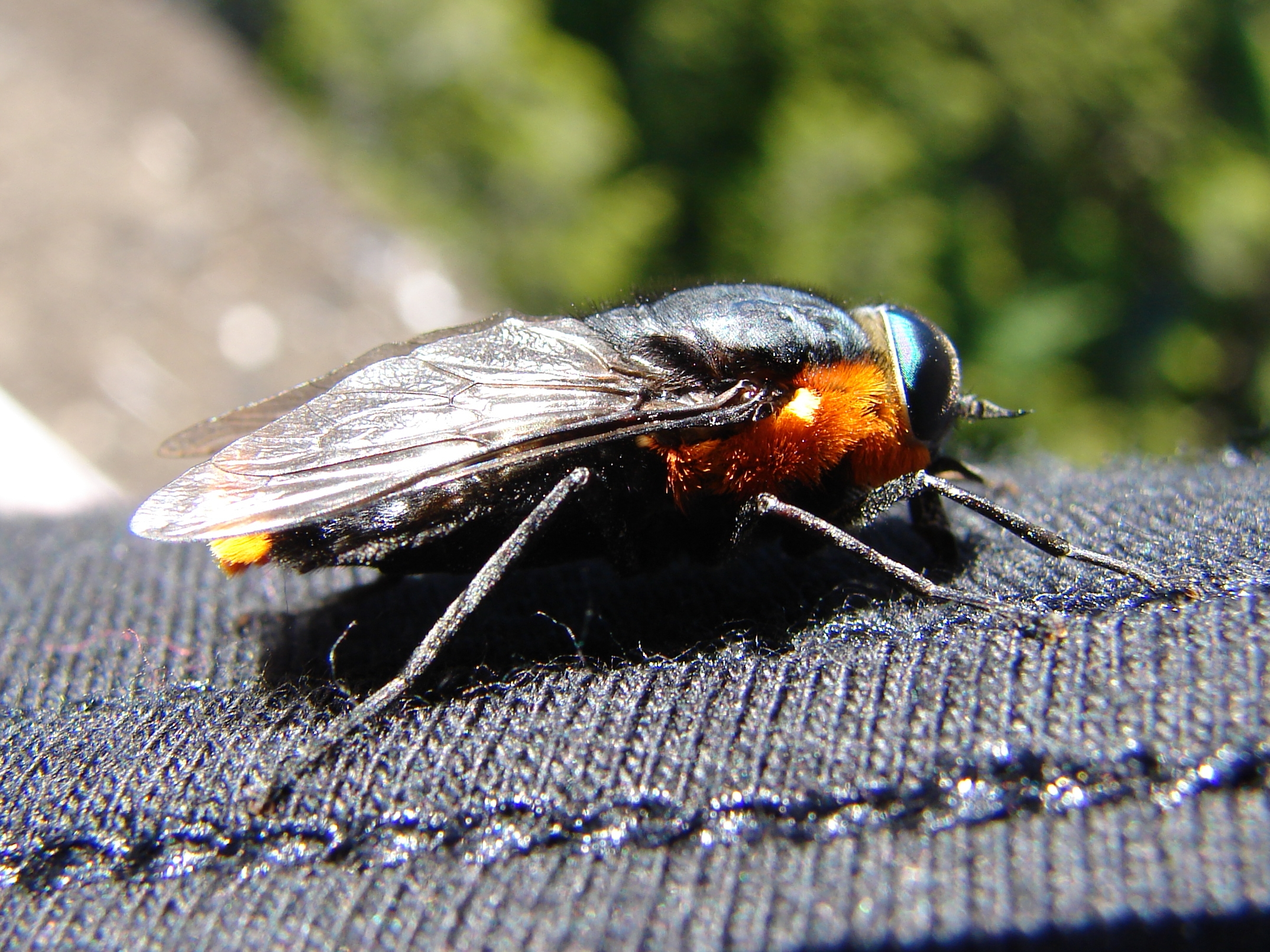
Scaptia lata, Chile

Tribe Scionini

- Anzomyia Lessard, 2012
- Aotearomyia Lessard, 2014
- Apocampta Schiner, 1868
- Copidapha Enderlein, 1922
- Fidena Walker, 1850
- Lepmia Fairchild, 1969
- Myioscaptia Mackerras, 1955
- Osca Walker, 1850
- Palimmecomyia Taylor, 1917
- Parosca Enderlein, 1922
- Pityocera Giglio-Tos, 1896
- Plinthina Walker, 1850
- Pseudomelpia Enderlein, 1922
- Pseudoscione Lutz, 1918
- Scaptia Walker, 1850
- Scione Walker, 1850
- Triclista Enderlein, 1922

=== Scepsidini ===
Tribe Scepsidini

- Scepsis Walker, 1850
