= Antarctic land bridge =

Geologically ancient antarctic landmass

The positions of South America, Antarctica, and Australia near the end of the land bridge's existence. The yellow arrows show the distribution of ocean currents before and after the breakup of the land bridge (forming the ACC in the second). The red arrows show the diverging plates of South America and Australia.

Notable past (purple) and current (orange) land bridges on a bathymetric equirectangular projection centred on 45° E

The Antarctic land bridge was a land bridge connecting the continents of South America, Antarctica, and Australia that existed from the Late Cretaceous to the Late Eocene. The land bridge consisted of the entire continent of Antarctica (at the time unglaciated), as well as much narrower, now-submerged landforms that connected Antarctica to both South America and Australia (with the land bridge between South America and Antarctica sometimes called the Weddellian Isthmus or the Isthmus of Scotia). At its greatest extent, the Antarctic land bridge allowed for a terrestrial connection between South America and Australia, allowing numerous animals and plants to disperse across both continents using it.

The Antarctic land bridge came to an end during the Late Eocene or Early Oligocene, when the formation of both the Drake Passage and Tasmanian Passage cut off any further land connections of either continent with Antarctica. These openings also created the Antarctic Circumpolar Current, which eventually led to the glaciation of Antarctica, making the continent largely inhospitable to any terrestrial life. Signals of the Antarctic land bridge's influence are still present in both the genetics and distribution of many modern animals and plants.

== History ==
As components of the supercontinent Gondwana, the continents of Antarctica, South America, and Australia were connected to each other for much of the Mesozoic. However, the supercontinent started to rapidly fragment from the Early Cretaceous onwards. By the time of the Late Cretaceous (96 Ma), a shallow seaway had started to develop between Australia and Antarctica, with only a narrow strip along the South Tasman Rise, joined to Wilkes Land, still connecting both continents. Evidence of dinosaurs dispersing between the continents has been inferred from the Australian sauropod Diamantinasaurus, which closely resembles the South American Sarmientosaurus, suggesting that a common ancestor of both dispersed across Antarctica. Australia and Antarctica finally broke apart around 45 million years ago, and the South Tasman Rise was likely already submerged by water a few million years prior to this point, forming the Tasmanian Passage. However, a steady circumpolar likely did not form between the continents until 30 million years ago.

Meanwhile, the tip of South America stayed closely connected to the Antarctic Peninsula via exposed parts of the Scotia Plate, with both starting to gradually separate starting from 50 million years ago. Continued seafloor spreading along the Scotia Ridge eventually separated both continents by 28 million years ago, forming the Drake Passage.

Thus, a narrow connection between South America, Antarctica, and Australia existed between ~96 to 50 million years ago, and South America and Antarctica (but not Australia) remained connected up to 28 million years ago. The breakup of these three continents can be considered the final step in the fragmentation of Gondwana. The narrower landforms that connected both continents to Antarctica may have been contiguous land during the Cretaceous, but by the Cenozoic, they had most likely turned into island chains (first separated by freshwater lakes, then shallow seas as ocean basins formed) that terrestrial organisms would have needed to island-hop across.

== Paleoecology ==
The term "Amphi-Pacific distribution" is used for taxa that have a distribution consisting of southern South America and Australia.

Taxa whose evolutionary history was influenced by the Antarctic land bridge include:

=== Vertebrates ===
- Monotremes (Monotremata)—Although now only present in Australia, which was likely their ancestral home, fossil evidence suggests that platypus-like monotremes inhabited southern South America during the latest Cretaceous and Paleocene, suggesting they briefly colonized South America via Antarctica.
- Marsupials (Marsupialia)—The two major clades of marsupials, the American Ameridelphia and the mostly Australian Australidelphia, are separated by the Antarctic continent. Marsupials are thought to have originated in South America, suggesting that australidelphians diverged after colonizing Australia via Antarctica during the Late Cretaceous or Paleocene. In addition, one australidelphian clade (Microbiotheria) is still found in South America, with fossil evidence suggesting that it also inhabited Antarctica.
- Perching birds (Passeriformes)—Although now globally distributed, phylogenetic studies indicate that the two major eupasserine lineages (Passeri and Tyranni) originated in Australasia and South America respectively, suggesting that the region covered by the land bridge was the ancestral home of the group. The initial split of Antarctica and Australia may have led to the divergences between these clades.
- Treefrogs (Hylidae)—The Australian treefrogs (Pelodryadinae) and the South American leaf frogs (Phyllomedusinae) are the sister taxa to one another. The two subfamilies appear to have split in the Early Eocene, with the ancestral Phyllomedusinae likely migrating across Antarctica to colonize Australia.
- Southern frogs (clade Australobatrachia)—Like the Hylidae, the Australobatrachia show a deep split between the South American Calyptocephalellidae and the Australasian Myobatrachoidea, which can be explained by migration across Antarctica. The divergences within this group are significantly older than that of the Hylidae. The genus Calyptocephalella also inhabited Antarctica during the Eocene based on fossil remains, further affirming the movement of frogs between these continents.
- Galaxiids (Galaxiidae)—Numerous trans-Antarctic divergences are present within this diadromous fish family, including between the Australian Lovettia & the South American Aplochiton, the Australian Galaxiella & its widespread sister group, the South American Brachygalaxias & its Australian sister group, and the South American Galaxias platei and the Australasian Neochanna.
- Temperate perches (Percichthyidae)—This freshwater fish family contains a single genus (Percichthys) in southern South America, and several genera in Australia. There is no evidence of percichthyids ever evolving a marine habitat, and it is likely that they took advantage of a brief freshwater connection between the three continents to reach their present distribution.

=== Invertebrates ===
- Chironomoid flies: a Late Eocene-aged divergence has been noted between Australian and South American species of several genera within this group, including Stictocladius and Botryocladius.
- Stratiomyid flies: a mid-late Eocene-aged divergence has been identified between the Australian Lagenosoma and the South American Auloceromyia, as well as a Cretaceous-aged divergence between the Australian Lecomyia and the South American Cyanauges.
- Hylurdrectonus beetles: a Late Cretaceous-aged divergence is present between the South American and Australian members of this clade.
- Paralamyctes centipedes: an Australia-South America divergence of uncertain age has been identified in this genus.
- Austrolittorina snails: an Australia/South America divergence of anywhere between the Cretaceous to Eocene has been identified within this marine snail clade.

=== Plants ===
- Plagiochila liverworts - Many Australian species within this genus have a sister species in South America, and vice versa. These divergences have been dated to the Eocene.
- Tree ferns (Cyatheaceae) - Divergences between the Australian and South American members of Sphaeropteris, Cyathea, and Alsophila have been identified, having occurred between the Late Cretaceous and Eocene
- Southern beeches (Nothofagus) - Many Australian/South American divergences, dating to the mid-late Eocene, have been identified within several different subgenera of this genus.
- Elaeocarpaceae - a Late Cretaceous-aged divergence has been identified between the Australian Peripentadenia and the South American Crinodendron.
- Proteaceae - an Early Eocene-aged divergence has been identified between the Australian Cardwellia and the South American Gevuina.
- Onagraceae - a Late Eocene-aged divergence has been identified within the Australian and South American subgenera of the genus Fuchsia.
- Palms (Arecaceae) - a Late Eocene-aged divergence has been identified between the Australian Oraniopsis and the South American Ceroxylon .
- Podostemaceae - a particularly ancient mid-Cretaceous divergence has been identified between the Australian Tristicha and the South American Mourera.
- Juncaginaceae - an Early Eocene-aged divergence has been identified between the Australian Cycnogeton and the South American Tetroncium.
- Corsiaceae - an Early Eocene-aged divergence has been identified between the South American Arachnitis and the Australian Corsia

== See also ==
- Bering Land Bridge
- Isthmus of Panama
- Great American Interchange
