= Opaluma rupaul =

Scientific classification
- Kingdom: Animalia
- Phylum: Arthropoda
- Clade: Pancrustacea
- Class: Insecta
- Order: Diptera
- Family: Stratiomyidae
- Subfamily: Antissinae
- Genus: Opaluma
- Species: O. rupaul

Binomial name
- Opaluma rupaul Lessard & Woodley, 2020

Australian species of soldier fly named for drag queen RuPaul

Opaluma rupaul is a species of Australian soldier fly, first described in 2020. Specimens of O. rupaul had been previously collected but left unstudied and were misidentified as belonging to the genus Lecomyia.

== Description ==
O. rupaul is between 6 and 9 mm (0.24 and 0.35 in) in length, with the males between 8 and 9 mm (0.31 and 0.35 in) and females between 6 and 8 mm (0.24 and 0.31 in).

It can be distinguished from O. sapphira by the green-copper colouration of the scutum and abdomen, white setae on the scutum, longer denticles (bristle structures) on the scutellum, more hyaline (transparent) wings, and differences with the male terminalia.

== Etymology ==
The species was named after RuPaul, an American drag queen, which was an "obvious decision" according to Lessard due to its "costume of shiny metallic rainbow colours" which resembles drag costumes. Other species described at the same time were named O. ednae (after fellow drag queen Dame Edna Everage) and O. fabulosa. One of the biologists who described it, CSIRO scientist Bryan Lessard, explained that the choice of name, in addition to honouring RuPaul, aimed to increase interest in the ecological role of invertebrates (which he also cited as a reason for his previously naming Scaptia beyonceae after Beyoncé, and other names drawn by CSIRO from pop culture) and to highlight that the scientific profession is open to LGBTQ people.
