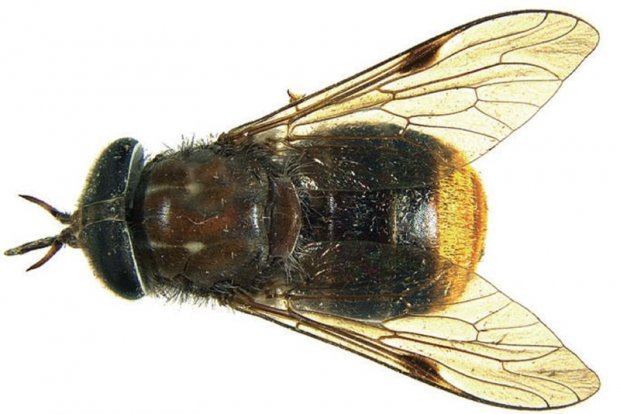
- Scaptia (Plinthina) beyonceae

Scientific classification
- Kingdom: Animalia
- Phylum: Arthropoda
- Class: Insecta
- Order: Diptera
- Family: Tabanidae
- Subfamily: Pangoniinae
- Tribe: Scionini
- Genus: Scaptia
- Subgenus: Plinthina; Walker, 1850)

Type species
- Pangonia macroporum Macquart, 1838

= Plinthina =

Genus of flies

Plinthina is a subgenus of Horse-fly in the tribe Scionini.

== Species ==
- Scaptia (Plinthina) arnhemensis Lessard, 2012
- Scaptia (Plinthina) aurifulga Lessard, 2011
- Scaptia (Plinthina) binotata Latreille, 1811
- Scaptia (Plinthina) beyonceae Lessard, 2011
- Scaptia (Plinthina) nelsonae Lessard, 2011
- Scaptia (Plinthina) nigripuncta Lessard, 2011
