= Antissa (disambiguation) =

Antissa is a historical city on the island of Lesbos

Antissa may also refer to:

- Antissa (mythology), a princess of Lesbos in Greek mythology
- Antissa (fly) Walker, 1854, a genus of flies in the family Stratiomyidae
- Antissa Stal, 1871, a genus of mantids in the family Hymenopodidae, considered to be a synonym of Odontomantis
