= Exodontha luteipes =

Scientific classification
- Kingdom: Animalia
- Phylum: Arthropoda
- Class: Insecta
- Order: Diptera
- Family: Stratiomyidae
- Subfamily: Antissinae
- Genus: Exodontha
- Species: E. luteipes

Binomial name
- Exodontha luteipes (Williston, 1885)

Synonyms
- Scoliopelta luteipes Williston, 1885

Species of fly

Exodontha luteipes is a species of soldier fly in the family Stratiomyidae.

== Distribution ==
Australia, Hawaiian Islands.
