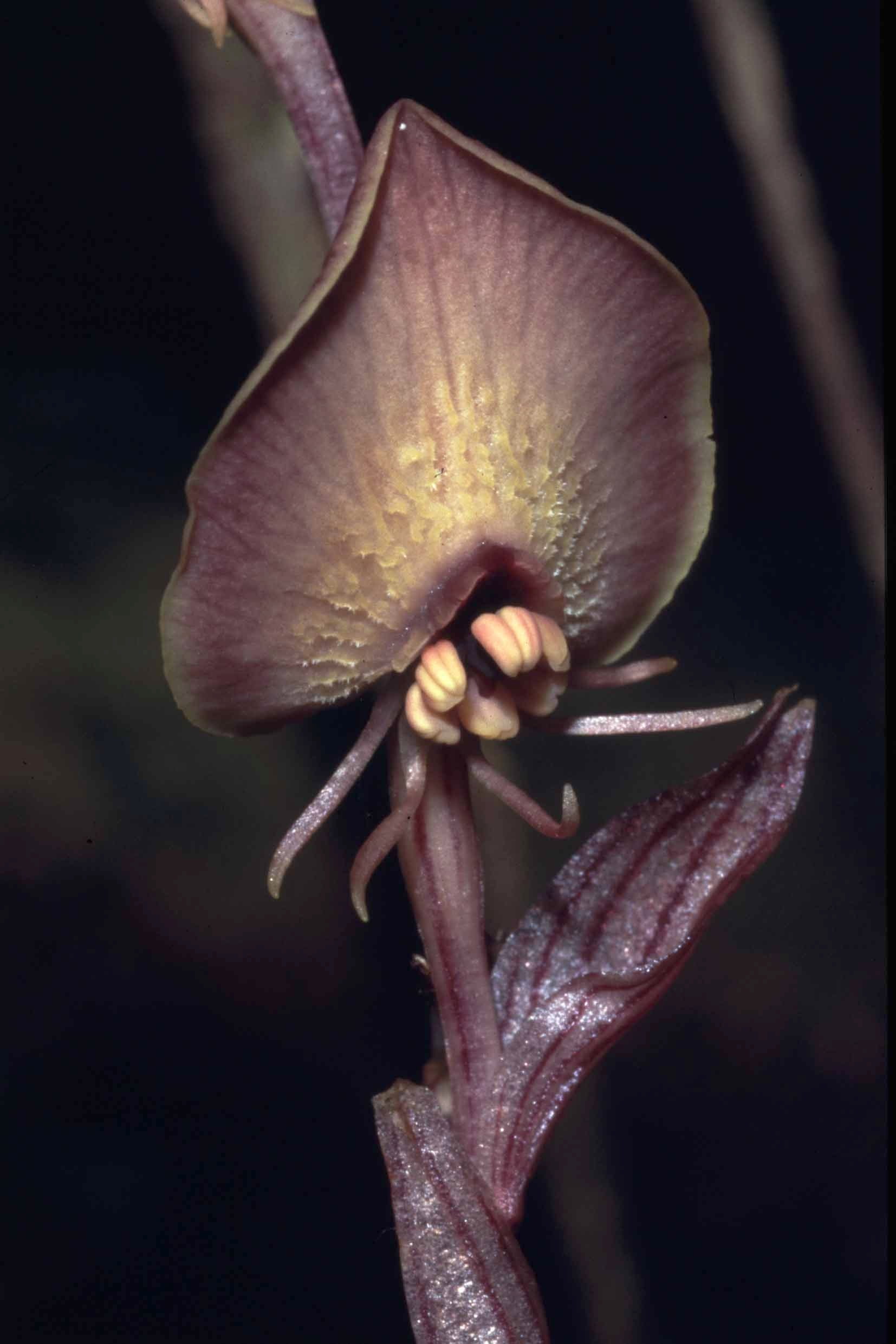
- Corsia ornata from Bird's Head Peninsula, Western New Guinea

Scientific classification
- Kingdom: Plantae
- Clade: Tracheophytes
- Clade: Angiosperms
- Clade: Monocots
- Order: Liliales
- Family: Corsiaceae
- Genus: Corsia; Becc.

Type species
- Corsia ornata Becc.

Species
- See text

= Corsia =

Genus of flowering plants

Corsia is a little-studied plant genus from the monocotyledon family Corsiaceae. It was first described in 1877 by Italian naturalist Odoardo Beccari and contains 25 species, all of which lack chlorophyll and parasitize fungi for nutrition. All 25 species are distributed through New Guinea, the Bismarck Archipelago, the Solomon Islands and Queensland, Australia.

== Description ==
In terms of appearance, the species of Corsia are quite uniform except for the flowers. Chromosome counts are known only from two species: Corsia cornuta and C. clypeata. Both have a diploid number (2n) of 18.

=== Habit ===
Corsia exist largely underground; only the seldom-formed flower stems develop above ground. The fine, thread-like and hairless root system is weakly branched and whitish, spreading widely just beneath the surface. Several hairless, unbranched and upright flowering stems sprout from a rhizome and are visible above ground. They are usually reddish in color and are 10 to 28 cm (3.9 to 11.0 in) high. The xylem is woody and not perforated.

=== Leaves ===
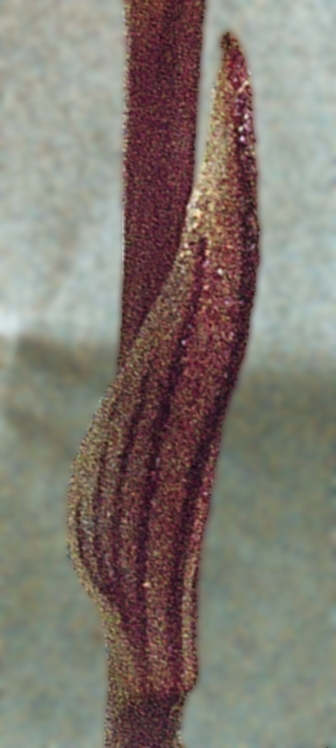
Leaf on a flowering stem of Corsia sp.

The foliage along the stem is evenly distributed, and consists of three to seven broadly ovate pointed leaves. Those on the rhizomes are less developed than the reddish leaves on the flowering stems. Along the stem the leaves grow alternately, at their bases they sheath the stem almost entirely.

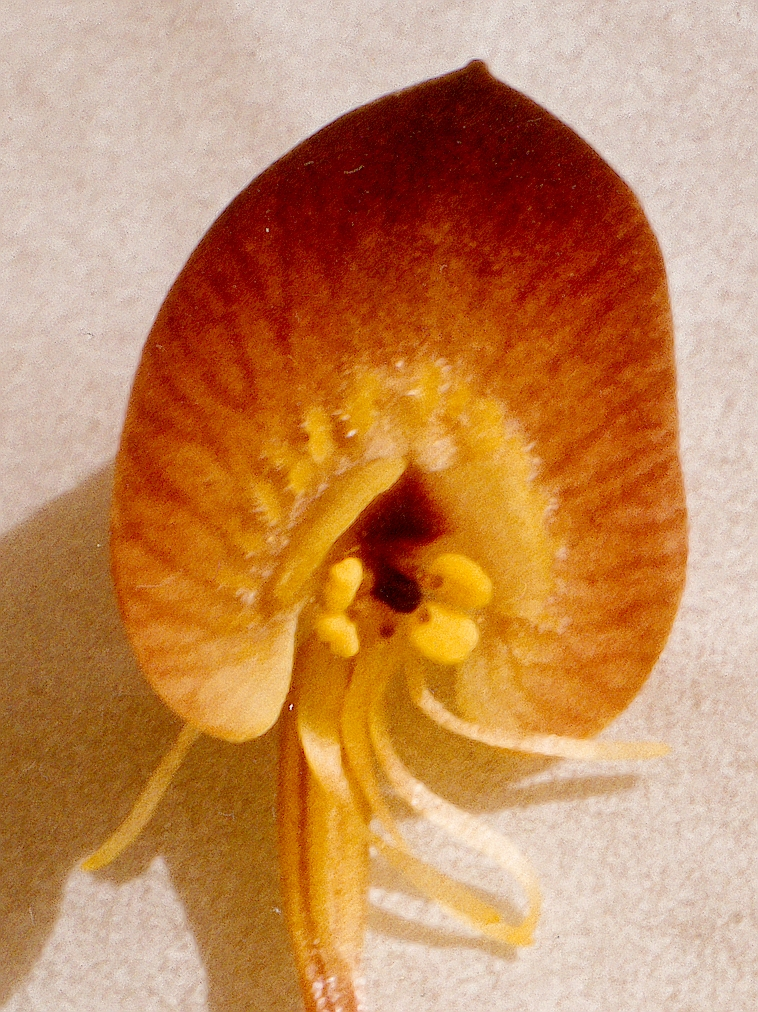
Corsia sp. flower

=== Flowers ===
The growth of Corsia flowers appears to be triggered by combination of rain and drought, usually by a prolonged rainy season followed by several dry days. The zygomorphic, trimerous, nodding flowers grow singly and are terminal on the stems. The tepals are colored pale red to brownish red, sometimes with a bit of pale yellow and rarely brownish-green.

The six tepals are approximately of the same shape and size, with the exception of the uppermost tepal, termed the labellum, which is considerably larger and usually heart-shaped. The tepals of the species of section Sessilis are 4 to 15 mm (0.16 to 0.59 in) long and 0.5 to 2.5 mm (0.020 to 0.098 in) wide. The tepals of the section Unguiculatis are 3 to 8.5 mm (0.12 to 0.33 in) long and 1 to 3.5 mm (0.039 to 0.138 in) wide. The labellum is about 5 to 25 mm (0.20 to 0.98 in) long and 4 to 22 mm (0.16 to 0.87 in) wide. The labellum encloses the floral bud until its opening, thereby protecting immature floral parts. The labellum is usually simple, but is occasionally bifurcated at the tip of the midrib.

The labellum of Corsia is similar in appearance to the labellum of some orchids, but is not homologous to them; in orchids the labellum is formed from an inner tepal (petal), but in Corsiaceae it forms from an outer tepal (sepal). In Corsia, unlike the orchids, all six stamens are fertile.

=== Fruit and seeds ===
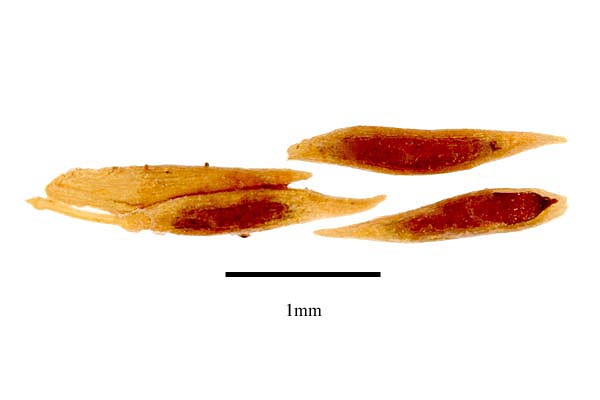
Fruits of Corsia ornata

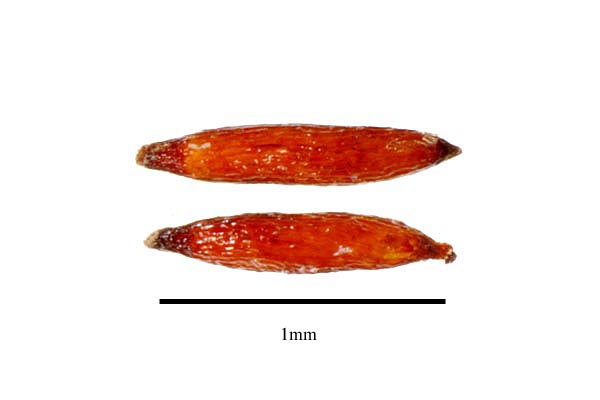
Seeds of Corsia ornata

After pollination (possibly by flies), the peduncles extend and a 3.5 cm (1.4 in) long and slender cylindrical yellowish brown capsule fruit forms. The small dust-like seeds are about 1 to 3.2 mm (0.039 to 0.126 in) long, 0.3 mm (0.012 in) thick and colored pale to dark brown. The seed coat tightly encloses the endosperm and its surface is finely grooved longitudinally. Although the native habitat of Corsia is relatively calm, seed dispersal is presumed to be facilitated by wind (anemochory).

== Distribution and habitat ==
Species of Corsia are generally found in floodplains and mountain forests at altitudes of 400 to 2,700 m (1,300 to 8,900 ft) above sea level. They grow in humus-rich soils in shaded areas of high humidity among decaying leaves.

The center of diversity for the genus is New Guinea. All species are endemic to New Guinea (including the Bismarck Archipelago), the Solomon Islands, and Australia.

== Ecology ==
Like other members of Corsiaceae, Corsia species lack chlorophyll and are thus incapable of photosynthesis. Instead, they are myco-heterotrophs, relying exclusively on parasitizing arbuscular mycorrhizal fungi for nutrition. Myco-heterotrophs were once mistakenly thought to be saprotrophic plants. It is now known that they do not obtain nourishment directly from decaying organic matter, instead they digest the hyphae of saprotrophic fungi with enzymes and absorb the resulting nutrients.

The host species of Corsia, and whether Corsia are even host specific, remains unknown. Corsia are sometimes found growing in association with other myco-heterotrophic plants like Burmannia, Sciaphila, and Cotylanthera tenuis.

== Taxonomy ==
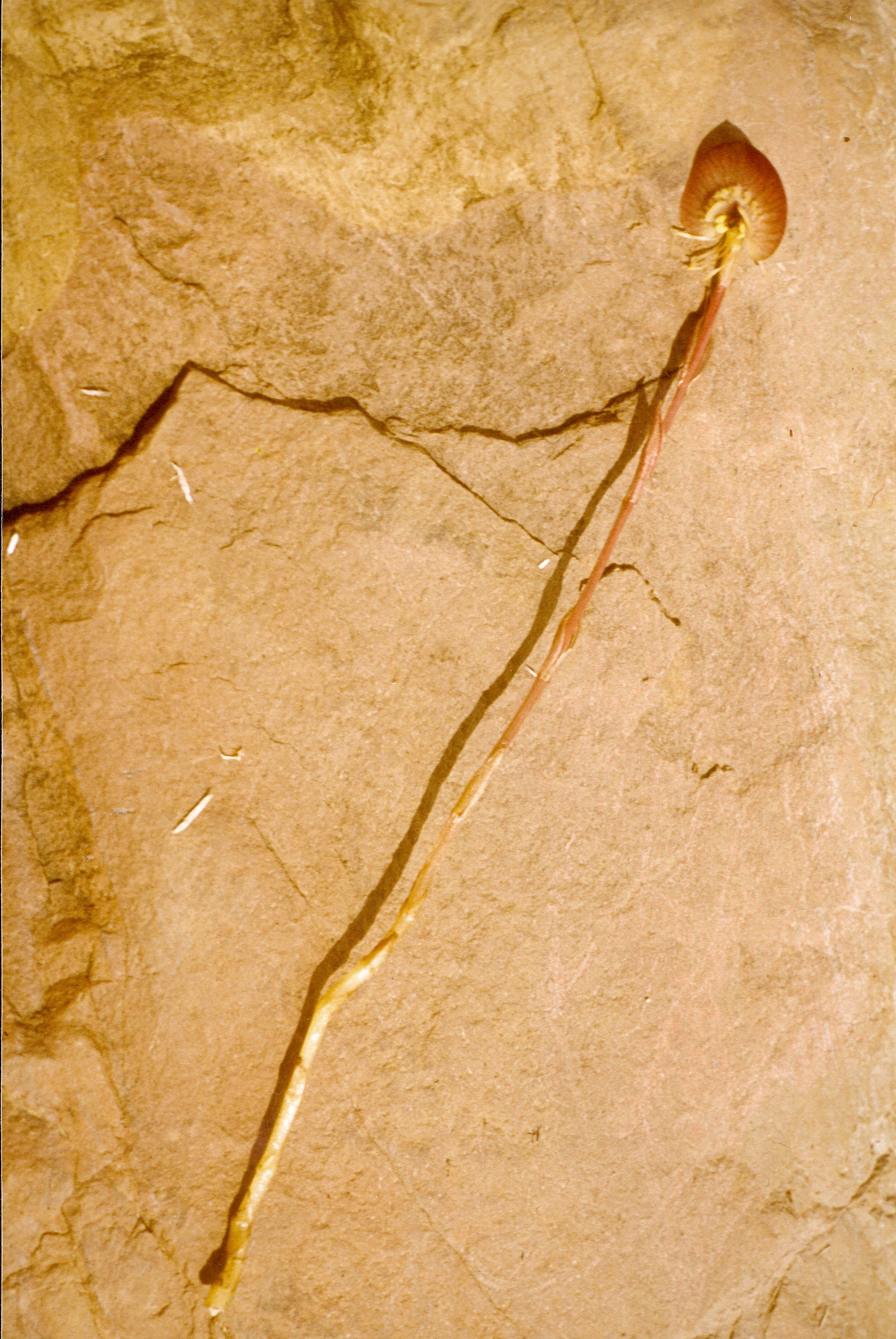
Corsia sp. from the Mount Hagen area of Papua New Guinea

Corsia is classified under the family Corsiaceae of the order Liliales. It is one of the three genera currently classified under Corsiaceae, the other two being Corsiopsis of China and Arachnitis of South America. It differs from the latter two in having several shoots arising from creeping rhizomes.

Corsia was first described in 1877 by the Italian naturalist Odoardo Beccari from specimens from New Guinea. He named it after the Marquis Bardo Corsi Salviati. It was classified under Burmanniaceae by the English botanist George Bentham in 1883 and grouped together with orchids (family Orchidaceae).

In 1938, Fredrik Pieter Jonker separated Arachnitis and Corsia from Burmanniaceae based on their strongly zygomorphic floral characteristics. Kores et al. (1978) also separated Corsia from Burmanniaceae after comparing the chromosome numbers of C. cornuta and C. clypeata (2n = 18) with the rest of Burmanniaceae (2n=32 to 136). Dahlgren & Clifford (1982) tentatively reclassified Corsiaceae as closer to lilies (order Liliales) than to orchids. Cribb et al. (1995) noted the significant differences between Corsia and the only other member of Corsiaceae then - Arachnitis. In 1996, Ibisch et al. challenged the monophyly of Corsiaceae, positing that Arachnitis may actually be more closely related to Orchidaceae than Corsia and recommended the separation of the former into its own family, Arachnitaceae.

Corsiopsis was discovered in 1999 by Zhang et al. and became the third genus included in the family Corsiaceae. Zhang also remarked that Corsiopsis seem to be more closely related to Corsia than to Arachnitis. Based on phylogenetic studies and reexamination of previous morphological studies, Neyland & Hennigan (2003) concluded that Corsia is not closely related to Arachnitis. The former probably has closer affinities with Campynemataceae of Liliales, while the latter may be more closely related to Thismia and/or Burmannia of Dioscoreales. However, Chase et al. (2006) concluded that Arachnitis falls within Liliales while Rudall & Eastman (2002) puts Corsia closer to either Campynemataceae or Thismia. As such, the taxonomic placement of Corsia and Corsiaceae remains problematic though they have been tentatively included in Liliales.

Corsia contains two sections, Unguiculatis and Sessilis, with 25 species. They are listed below along with their distribution ranges:

Section Unguiculatis P.Royen

- Corsia acuminata L.O.Williams (Papua New Guinea)
- Corsia cornuta P.Royen (Papua New Guinea)
- Corsia purpurata L.O.Williams (Papua New Guinea)
- Corsia triceratops P.Royen (Yapen Island)
- Corsia unguiculata Schltr. (Papua New Guinea)
- Corsia wiakabui (W.N.Takeuchi & Pipoly) D.L.Jones & B.Gray (southern New Ireland, Papua New Guinea)

Section Sessilis P.Royen

- Corsia arfakensis Gibbs (Western New Guinea, including Yapen Island)
- Corsia boridiensis P.Royen (Papua New Guinea)
- Corsia brassii P.Royen (Papua New Guinea)
- Corsia clypeata P.Royen (Papua New Guinea)
- Corsia cordata Schltr. (Papua New Guinea)
- Corsia crenata J.J.Sm. (Indonesia)
- Corsia cyclopensisP.Royen (Papua New Guinea and Indonesia)
- Corsia dispar D.L.Jones & B.Gray (Herberton Range in Queensland, Australia)
- Corsia haianjensis P.Royen (Papua New Guinea and Solomon Islands)
- Corsia huonensis P.Royen (Papua New Guinea)
- Corsia lamellata Schltr. (Papua New Guinea)
- Corsia merimantaensis P.Royen (New Guinea)
- Corsia ornata Becc. (Papua New Guinea)
- Corsia papuana P.Royen (Papua New Guinea)
- Corsia pyramidata P.Royen (Papua New Guinea and Solomon Islands)
- Corsia resiensis P.Royen (Western New Guinea)
- Corsia torricellensis Schltr. (Northeast Papua New Guinea)
- Corsia viridopurpurea P.Royen (Papua New Guinea)
- Corsia wubungu P.Royen (Papua New Guinea)

== See also ==
- List of myco-heterotrophic genera

== Bibliography ==
- P. Van Royen:Sertulum Papuanum 17th Corsiaceae of New Guinea and surrounding areas in: Webbia 27: pp. 223–255, 1972, ISSN 0083-7792
- Traudel Rübsamen: Morphologische, embryologische und systematische Untersuchungen an Burmanniaceae und Corsiaceae (Mit Ausblick auf die Orchidaceae-Apostasioideae) [Morphological, embryological and systematic studies of Burmanniaceae and Corsiaceae (With view on the Orchidaceae-Apostasioideae)], 1986, ISBN 3-443-64004-4
- Karl Schumann, Karl Lauterbach: Nachträge zur Flora der deutschen Schutzgebiete in der Südsee mit Ausschluss Samoa's und der Karolinen [Supplements to Flora of the German protectorates in the Pacific to the exclusion of Samoa's and the Carolinas], Leipzig, 1905, Online version
- R. Schlechter: Neue Corsiaceae Papuasiens [New Papuan Corsiaceae Parisiens], in: Botanical yearbooks for systematics, plant geography and plant history, Vol. 49, pp. 109–112, 1913, Stuttgart, Online version
- Dian-Xiang Zhang, Richard M. K. Saunders, Chi-Ming Hu: Corsiopsis chinensis gen. et sp. nov. (Corsiaceae): First Record of the Family in Asia, in: Systematic Botany, Vol. 24, No. 3 (Jul. - Sep., 1999), S. 311-314, (Abstract Online)
- Merckx, Vincent S. F. T.; Freudenstein, John V.; Kissling, Jonathan; et al. (2013). "Taxonomy and Classification". In Merckx, Vincent (ed.). Mycoheterotrophy: the biology of plants living on fungi. New York: Springer Science+Business Media. pp. 19–101. doi:10.1007/978-1-4614-5209-6. ISBN 978-1-4614-5208-9. S2CID 259078590.
