= Dicranophora =

Dicranophora is the scientific name of two genera of organisms and may refer to:

- Dicranophora (fly), a genus of insects in the family Stratiomyidae
- Dicranophora (fungus), a genus of fungi in the family Mucoraceae
