= Pezodontina =

Scientific classification
- Kingdom: Animalia
- Phylum: Arthropoda
- Class: Insecta
- Order: Diptera
- Family: Stratiomyidae
- Subfamily: Raphiocerinae
- Tribe: Raphiocerini
- Genus: Pezodontina; Lindner, 1949

Type species
- Pezodontina guianae Lindner, 1949

Genus of flies

Pezodontina is a genus of flies in the family Stratiomyidae.

== Species ==
- Pezodontina guianae Lindner, 1949
- Pezodontina pleuralis (James, 1949)
