= Lysozus =

Scientific classification
- Kingdom: Animalia
- Phylum: Arthropoda
- Clade: Pancrustacea
- Class: Insecta
- Order: Diptera
- Family: Stratiomyidae
- Subfamily: Raphiocerinae
- Tribe: Raphiocerini
- Genus: Lysozus; Enderlein, 1914

Type species
- Lysozus columbianus Enderlein, 1914

Synonyms
- Lyzozus Frey, 1934

Genus of flies

Lysozus is a genus of flies in the family Stratiomyidae.

== Species ==
- Lysozus columbianus Enderlein, 1914

== Distribution ==
Colombia.
