= Dolichothrix (fly) =

Scientific classification
- Kingdom: Animalia
- Phylum: Arthropoda
- Class: Insecta
- Order: Diptera
- Family: Stratiomyidae
- Subfamily: Raphiocerinae
- Tribe: Raphiocerini
- Genus: Dolichothrix; McFadden, 1970

Type species
- Dolichothrix melanothorax McFadden, 1970

Genus of flies

Dolichothrix is a genus of flies in the family Stratiomyidae.

== Species ==
- Dolichothrix melanothorax McFadden, 1970

== Distribution ==
Mexico.
