= Raphiocerini =

Scientific classification
- Kingdom: Animalia
- Phylum: Arthropoda
- Clade: Pancrustacea
- Class: Insecta
- Order: Diptera
- Family: Stratiomyidae
- Subfamily: Raphiocerinae
- Tribe: Raphiocerini; Schiner, 1868

Subfamily of flies

Raphiocerini is a tribe of flies in the family Stratiomyidae.

== Genera ==
- Brachythrix McFadden, 1970
- Cyclophleps James, 1943
- Dactylothrix Pimentel & Pujol-Luz, 2001
- Dicamptocrana Frey, 1934
- Dicranophora Macquart, 1834
- Dolichothrix McFadden, 1970
- Heptozus Lindner, 1949
- Histiodroma Schiner, 1868
- Lysozus Enderlein, 1914
- Neoraphiocera Pimentel & Pujol-Luz, 2001
- Pezodontina Lindner, 1949
- Phanerozus James, 1966
- Pseudocyclophleps Pimentel & Pujol-Luz, 2001
- Pseudohistiodroma Pimentel & Pujol-Luz, 2001
- Raphiocera Macquart, 1834
- Rondonocera Pimentel & Pujol-Luz, 2001
- Rhaphioceroides Brunetti, 1927
