= Analcocerus =

Scientific classification
- Kingdom: Animalia
- Phylum: Arthropoda
- Class: Insecta
- Order: Diptera
- Family: Stratiomyidae
- Subfamily: Raphiocerinae
- Tribe: Analcocerini
- Genus: Analcocerus; Loew, 1855

Type species
- Analcocerus atriceps Loew, 1855

Genus of flies

Analcocerus is a genus of flies in the family Stratiomyidae.

== Species ==
- Analcocerus atriceps Loew, 1855
- Analcocerus orbitalis James, 1943
- Analcocerus taurus James, 1943

== Distribution ==
Brazil.
