= Mourera aspera =

Scientific classification
- Kingdom: Plantae
- Clade: Tracheophytes
- Clade: Angiosperms
- Clade: Eudicots
- Clade: Rosids
- Order: Malpighiales
- Family: Podostemaceae
- Genus: Mourera
- Species: M. aspera

Binomial name
- Mourera aspera Riedel

Species of flowering plant

Mourera aspera is a species of flowering plant in the family Podostemaceae. It is found in South America.
