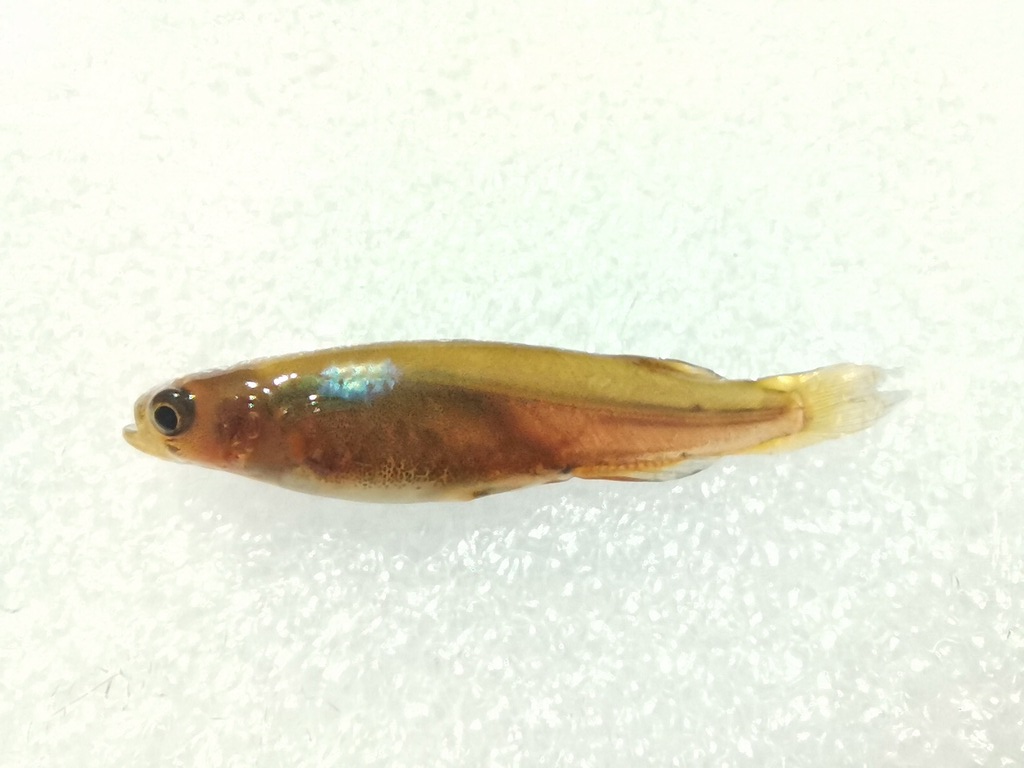

Conservation status
- Endangered (IUCN 2.3)

Scientific classification
- Kingdom: Animalia
- Phylum: Chordata
- Class: Actinopterygii
- Division: Teleostei
- Order: Galaxiiformes
- Family: Galaxiidae
- Genus: Brachygalaxias
- Species: B. bullocki

Binomial name
- Brachygalaxias bullocki (Regan, 1908)
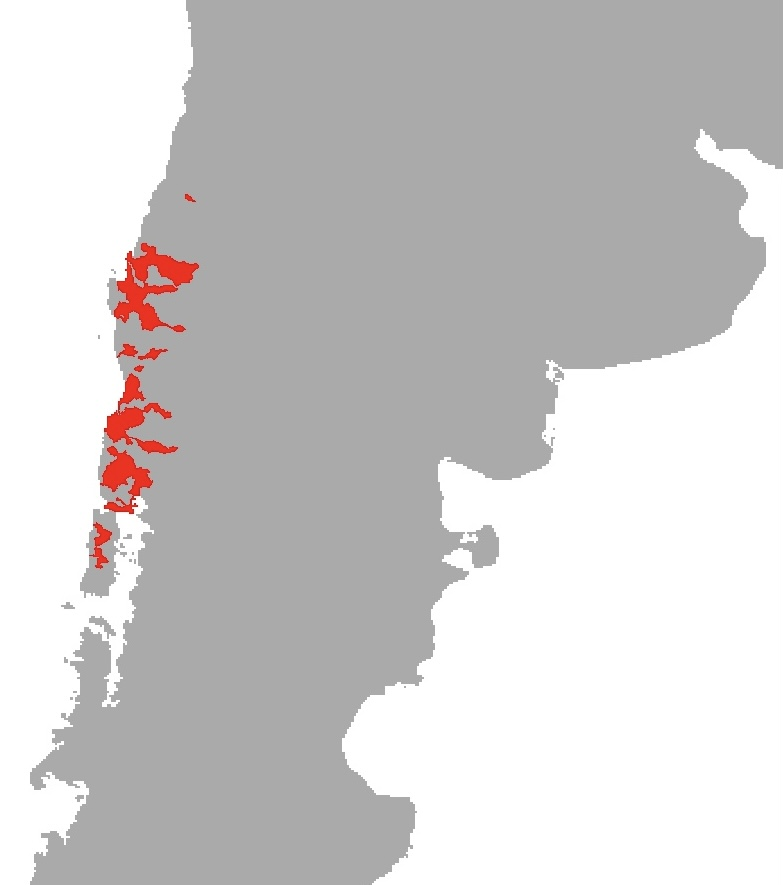

Synonyms
- Galaxias bullocki Regan, 1908

= Brachygalaxias bullocki =

Species of ray-finned fish

Brachygalaxias bullocki, the red jollytail or puye, is a species of freshwater ray-finned fish belonging to the family Galaxiidae, the galaxiids. This fish is endemic to Chile.

== Taxonomy ==
Brachygalaxias bullocki was first formally described as Galaxias bullocki in 1908 by the British ichthyologist Charles Tate Regan with its type locality given as Maquehue, near Temuco in southern Chile. In 1928 Carl H. Eigenmann proposed the new monospecific genus Brachygalaxias with G. bullocki being its only species making it the type species by monotypy. In 1983 Klaus Busse described a second species, B. gotheis, in this genus, although some still regard this taxon as a synonym of B. bullocki. The genus Brachygalaxias belongs to the subfamily Galaxiinae in the family Galaxiidae, the only family on the order Galaxiiformes.

== Etymology ==
Brachgalaxias bullocki is the type species of the genus Brachgalaxias, this name prefixes brachy-, which means "short" and refers to the short body of this species, onto the genus name Galaxias, the type genus of the family Galaxiidae. Regan said that this was "the smallest of the Galaxiidae in Chile". The specific name honours the American agronomist Dillman Samuel Bullock, who lived in Chile and collected many fish specimens, including the holotype of this species.

== Description ==
Brachgalaxias bullocki is a small fish with a thick, short body which is scaleless. The head is small and dorsally flattened with large eyes . The lower jaw protrudes a little beyond the upper jaw and the teeth are small and conicalThe pectoral fin does not extend as far as the ventral surface of the body while the anal fin has its origin opposite that of the dorsal fin. The dordsal fin is short with a rounded margin. In preserved speciemsn the overall colour is yellowish grey on the sides and ventral surface, the dorsal surface being a bit darker. In the adult fishes of both sexes there is a longitudinal red band along the sides. This species has a maximum standard length of 5.5 cm (2.2 in).

== Distribution and habitat ==
Brachgalaxias bullocki is endemic to Chile where it occurs from the Maule Region south to the Los Lagos Region, including Chiloé Island. It has been recorded from the Nonguén Estuary in Concepción, Puerto Varas, Abtao, Ensenada (Chile) and El Vergel (Los Lagos). It is occasionally found along the shoreline of Lake Riñihue in Valdivia) and in the effluent river of that lake. It is an entirely freshwater species, although it can be found in a variety of habitats including riffles, runs and pools of rivers, the shorelines of lakes and other wetlands, preferring areas with aquatic vegetation. It can tolerate eutrophication and can be found in wetlands in agricultural areas.

== Biology ==
Brachygalaxias bullocki breeds in the winter and the females lay their eggs among aquatic plants. The diet of this fish consists of invertebrates such as insect larvae, chironomids, amphipods, copepods and cladocerans.

== Conservation status ==
Brachygalaxias bullocki is classified as Endangered by the International Union for Conservation of Nature. This species has a wide distribution in Chile but the population has declined and been extirpated from some areas. These declines have mainly been caused by large populations of invasive salmon and trout species. This has resulted in the population declining by half between 2014 and 2024. With the species localized distribution, this decline is expected to continue.
