= Rondonocera =

Scientific classification
- Kingdom: Animalia
- Phylum: Arthropoda
- Class: Insecta
- Order: Diptera
- Family: Stratiomyidae
- Subfamily: Raphiocerinae
- Tribe: Raphiocerini
- Genus: Rondonocera; Pujol-Luz, 2001

Type species
- Rondonocera melanochrysa Pujol-Luz, 2001

Genus of flies

Rondonocera is a genus of flies in the family Stratiomyidae.

== Species ==
- Rondonocera melanochrysa Pimentel & Pujol-Luz, 2001

== Distribution ==
Brazil.
