= Opaluma =

Scientific classification
- Kingdom: Animalia
- Phylum: Arthropoda
- Clade: Pancrustacea
- Class: Insecta
- Order: Diptera
- Family: Stratiomyidae
- Subfamily: Antissinae
- Genus: Opaluma; Lessard & Woodley, 2020

Genus of insects

Opaluma is a genus of Australian soldier flies in the subfamily Antissinae.

== Species ==
Opaluma has seven species, all described by Bryan Lessard and Norman Woodley:

- O. ednae (Lessard & Woodley, 2020)
- O. fabulosa (Lessard & Woodley, 2020)
- O. iridescens (Lessard & Woodley, 2020)
- O. opulens (Lessard & Woodley, 2020)
- O. rupaul (Lessard & Woodley, 2020)
- O. sapphira (Lessard & Woodley, 2020)
- O. unicornis (Lessard & Woodley, 2020)
