= Anisoscapus =

Scientific classification
- Kingdom: Animalia
- Phylum: Arthropoda
- Class: Insecta
- Order: Diptera
- Family: Stratiomyidae
- Subfamily: Raphiocerinae
- Tribe: Analcocerini
- Genus: Anisoscapus; McFadden, 1970

Type species
- Anisoscapus chlorovittatus McFadden, 1970

Genus of flies

Anisoscapus is a genus of flies in the family Stratiomyidae.

== Species ==
- Anisoscapus chlorovittatus McFadden, 1970
- Anisoscapus ochraceus McFadden, 1970

== Distribution ==
Mexico.
