= Dicamptocrana =

Scientific classification
- Kingdom: Animalia
- Phylum: Arthropoda
- Class: Insecta
- Order: Diptera
- Family: Stratiomyidae
- Subfamily: Raphiocerinae
- Tribe: Raphiocerini
- Genus: Dicamptocrana; Frey, 1934

Type species
- Dicamptocrana jorgenseni Frey, 1934

Synonyms
- Dicamtocrana Pujol-Luz, 2002

Genus of flies

Dicamptocrana is a genus of flies in the family Stratiomyidae.

== Species ==
- Dicamptocrana jorgenseni Frey, 1934

== Distribution ==
Paraguay.
