= Histiodroma =

Scientific classification
- Kingdom: Animalia
- Phylum: Arthropoda
- Class: Insecta
- Order: Diptera
- Family: Stratiomyidae
- Subfamily: Raphiocerinae
- Tribe: Raphiocerini
- Genus: Histiodroma; Schiner, 1868

Synonyms
- Histiodroma Schiner, 1868; Histriodroma Pujol-Luz, 2000

Genus of flies

Histiodroma is a genus of flies in the family Stratiomyidae.

== Species ==
- Histiodroma fascipennis James, 1943
- Histiodroma inermis (Wiedemann, 1830)
- Histiodroma tricolor James, 1940
