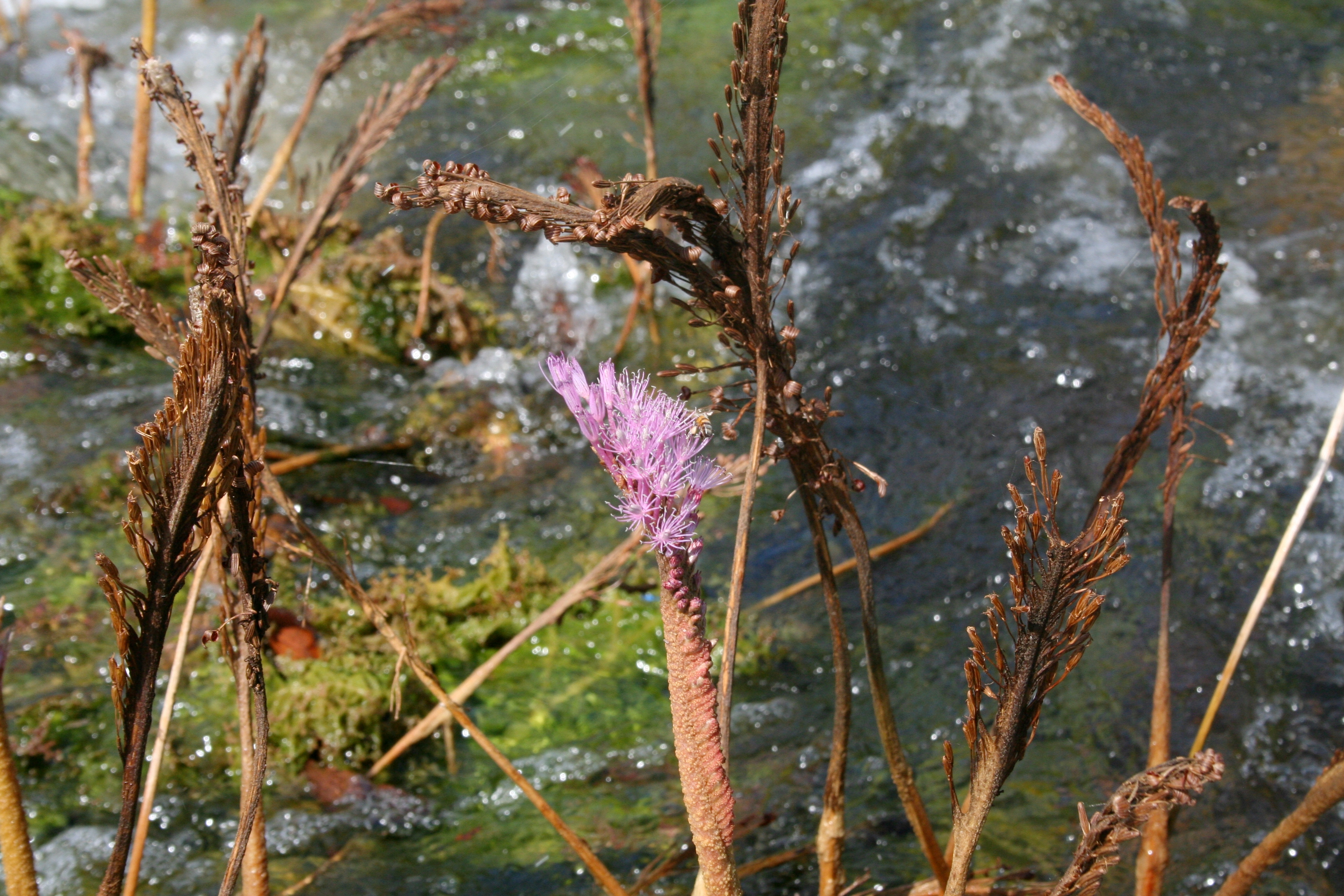
- Mourera fluviatilis

Scientific classification
- Kingdom: Plantae
- Clade: Embryophytes
- Clade: Tracheophytes
- Clade: Angiosperms
- Clade: Eudicots
- Clade: Rosids
- Order: Malpighiales
- Family: Podostemaceae
- Genus: Mourera; Aubl. (1775)

Synonyms
- Lacis Schreb. (1789), nom. superfl.; Lonchostephus Tul. (1852); Stengelia Neck. (1790), opus utique oppr.; Tulasneantha P.Royen (1951)

= Mourera =

Genus of plants

Mourera is a genus of flowering plants belonging to the family Podostemaceae.

Its native range is tropical South America, from Venezuela and the Guianas through Brazil to Bolivia, Paraguay, and northeastern Argentina.

It appears to be most closely related to the cosmopolitan Tristicha. The common ancestor of both appears to have dispersed across the Antarctic land bridge during the mid-Cretaceous.

== Species ==
Eight species are accepted.

- Mourera alcicornis (Tul.) P.Royen
- Mourera aspera (Raeusch.) Tul.
- Mourera elegans (Tul.) Baill.
- Mourera fluviatilis Aubl.
- Mourera glazioviana Warm.
- Mourera monadelpha (Bong.) C.T.Philbrick & C.P.Bove
- Mourera schwackeana Warm.
- Mourera weddelliana Tul.
