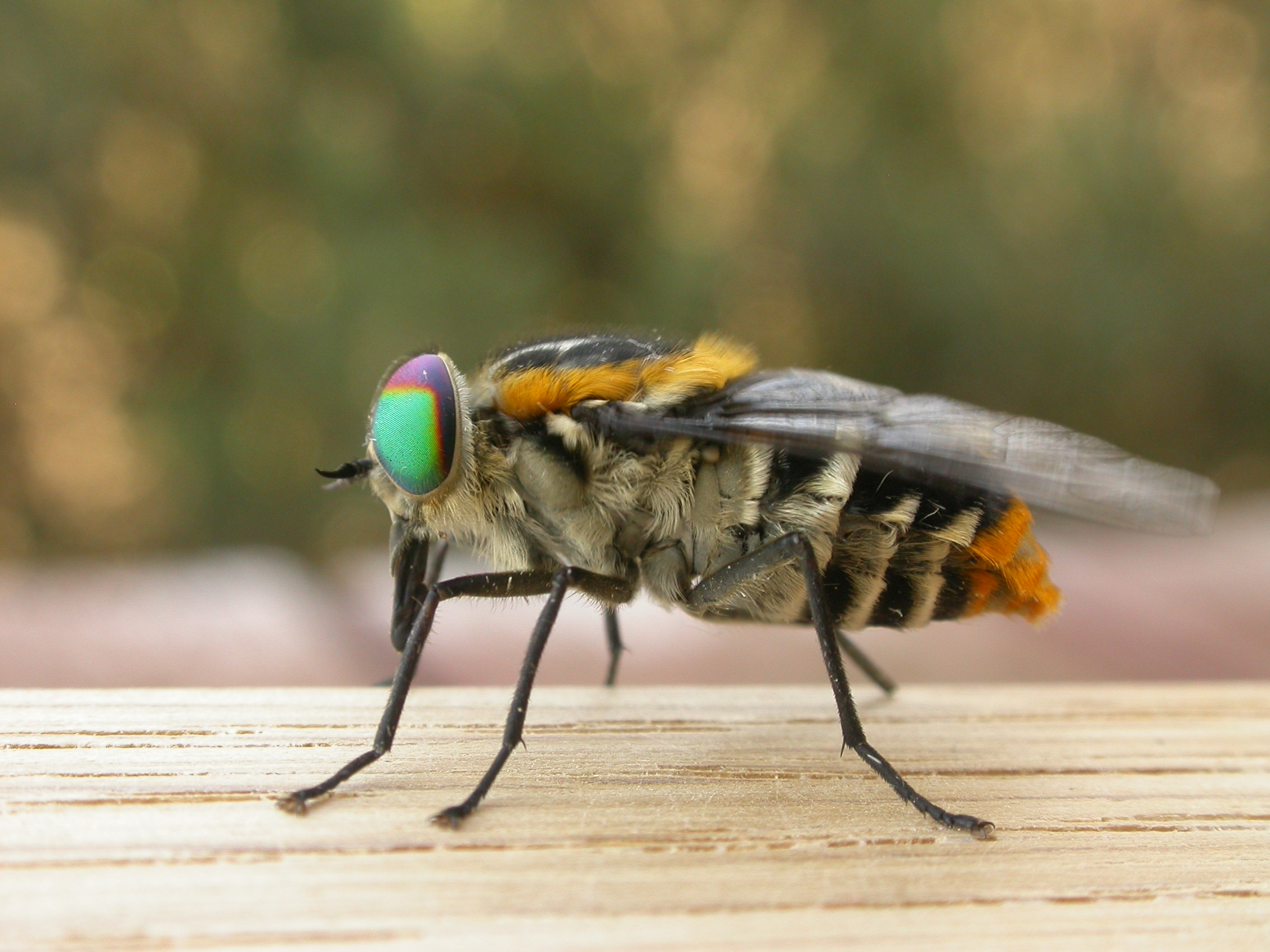

Scientific classification
- Kingdom: Animalia
- Phylum: Arthropoda
- Clade: Pancrustacea
- Class: Insecta
- Order: Diptera
- Family: Tabanidae
- Subfamily: Pangoniinae
- Tribe: Scionini
- Genus: Scaptia
- Species: S. auriflua

Binomial name
- Scaptia auriflua (Donovan, 1805)

Synonyms
- Tabanus auriflua Donovan, 1805

= Scaptia auriflua =

Species of fly

Scaptia auriflua, the flower-feeding march fly, is a species of horse flies that occurs in Australia. Unlike other march flies this species does not bite and does not feed on blood, it strictly drinks nectar.

== Description ==
Adults are about 10 millimetres (0.4 in) in length and mimic bees with dense hair and a golden coloration. Their eyes meet in the middle and the eye coloration differs from light source to light source.
