= Pseudocyclophleps =

Scientific classification
- Kingdom: Animalia
- Phylum: Arthropoda
- Class: Insecta
- Order: Diptera
- Family: Stratiomyidae
- Subfamily: Raphiocerinae
- Tribe: Raphiocerini
- Genus: Pseudocyclophleps; Pujol-Luz, 2001

Type species
- Rhapiocera cruciana Lindner, 1951

Genus of flies

Pseudocyclophleps is a genus of flies in the family Stratiomyidae.

== Species ==
- Pseudocyclophleps cruciana (Lindner, 1951)

== Distribution ==
Peru.
