= Neanalcocerus =

Scientific classification
- Kingdom: Animalia
- Phylum: Arthropoda
- Class: Insecta
- Order: Diptera
- Family: Stratiomyidae
- Subfamily: Raphiocerinae
- Tribe: Analcocerini
- Genus: Neanalcocerus; James, 1943

Type species
- Analcocerus hortulanus Williston, 1900

Genus of flies

Neanalcocerus is a genus of flies in the family Stratiomyidae.

== Species ==
- Neanalcocerus hortulanus (Williston, 1900)

== Distribution ==
Mexico.
