= Brachygalaxias gothei =

Conservation status
- Data Deficient (IUCN 2.3)

Scientific classification
- Kingdom: Animalia
- Phylum: Chordata
- Class: Actinopterygii
- Order: Galaxiiformes
- Family: Galaxiidae
- Genus: Brachygalaxias
- Species: B. gothei

Binomial name
- Brachygalaxias gothei Busse, 1982
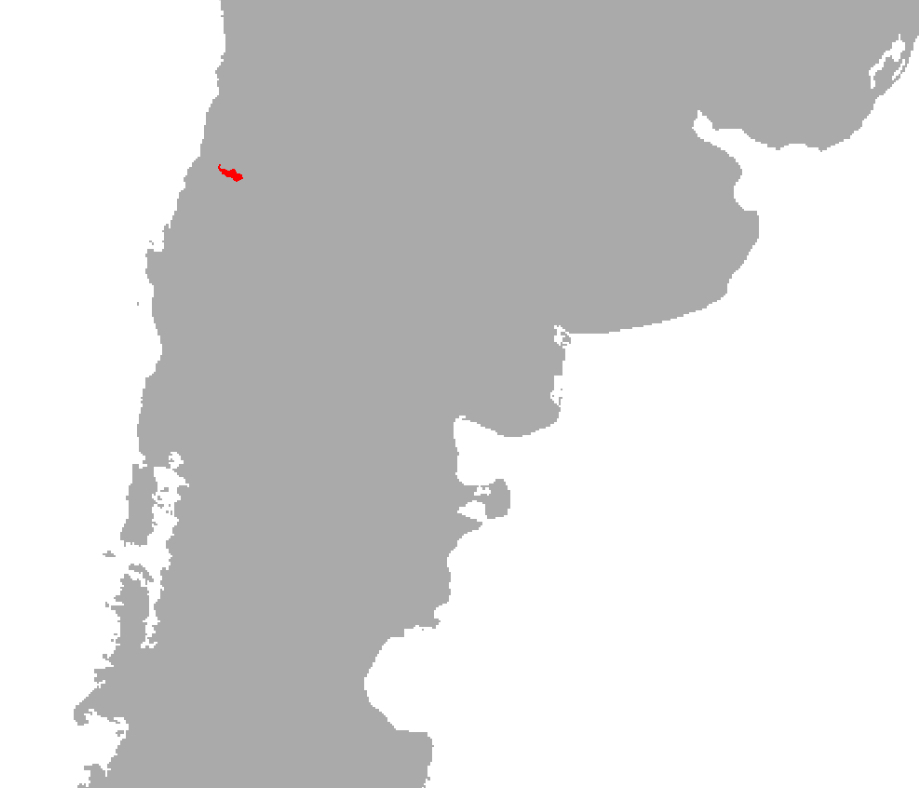

Species of ray-finned fish

Brachygalaxias gothei (known locally as puye) is a species of ray-finned fish in the family Galaxiidae endemic to Chile. It was formerly listed as Vulernable in 1994 until being changed in 1996. It is considered a synonym of Brachygalaxias bullocki but is listed separately by the IUCN Red List.
