= Dactylothrix =

Scientific classification
- Kingdom: Animalia
- Phylum: Arthropoda
- Class: Insecta
- Order: Diptera
- Family: Stratiomyidae
- Subfamily: Raphiocerinae
- Tribe: Raphiocerini
- Genus: Dactylothrix; Pujol-Luz, 2001

Type species
- Dactylothrix indicatrix Pimentel & Pujol-Luz, 2001

Genus of flies

Dactylothrix is a genus of flies in the family Stratiomyidae.

== Species ==
- Dactylothrix indicatrix Pimentel & Pujol-Luz, 2001

== Distribution ==
Ecuador.
