= Mourera alcicornis =

Scientific classification
- Kingdom: Plantae
- Clade: Tracheophytes
- Clade: Angiosperms
- Clade: Eudicots
- Clade: Rosids
- Order: Malpighiales
- Family: Podostemaceae
- Genus: Mourera
- Species: M. alcicornis

Binomial name
- Mourera alcicornis van Royen, 1953

Species of insect

Mourera alcicornis is a species of flowering plant belong to the family Podostemaceae. It is found in South America.
