= Discopteromyia =

Scientific classification
- Kingdom: Animalia
- Phylum: Arthropoda
- Class: Insecta
- Order: Diptera
- Family: Stratiomyidae
- Subfamily: Antissinae
- Genus: Discopteromyia; Meijere, 1913

Type species
- Discopteromyia bicincta Meijere, 1913

Genus of flies

Discopteromyia is a genus of flies in the family Stratiomyidae.

== Species ==
- Discopteromyia bicincta Meijere, 1913
- Discopteromyia fascipennis James, 1978
- Discopteromyia inermis James, 1978
