= Raphiocera =

Scientific classification
- Kingdom: Animalia
- Phylum: Arthropoda
- Class: Insecta
- Order: Diptera
- Family: Stratiomyidae
- Subfamily: Raphiocerinae
- Tribe: Raphiocerini
- Genus: Raphiocera; Macquart, 1834

Type species
- Sargus armatus Wiedemann, 1830

Synonyms
- Basentidema Macquart, 1838; Hoplistes Macquart, 1834; Rhamphiocera Scudder, 1882; Rhaphiocera Agassiz, 1846; Rhaphiocera Macquart, 1846; Rhapiocera Wulp, 1879

Genus of flies

Raphiocera is a genus of flies in the family Stratiomyidae.

== Species ==
- Raphiocera armata (Wiedemann, 1830)
- Raphiocera bispinosa (Wiedemann, 1830)
- Raphiocera hoplistes (Wiedemann, 1830)
- Raphiocera hortulana (Wiedemann, 1830)
- Raphiocera papaveroi Pimentel & Pujol-Luz, 2003
- Raphiocera syrphoides (Macquart, 1838)
