= Antissella =

Scientific classification
- Kingdom: Animalia
- Phylum: Arthropoda
- Class: Insecta
- Order: Diptera
- Family: Stratiomyidae
- Subfamily: Antissinae
- Genus: Antissella; White, 1914

Type species
- Beris parvidentata Macquart, 1850

Genus of flies

Antissella is a genus of flies in the family Stratiomyidae.

== Species ==
- Antissella alicespringsensis Lessard & Woodley, 2021
- Antissella elongata Lessard & Woodley, 2021
- Antissella kalbarriensis Lessard & Woodley, 2021
- Antissella nigricentalis Lessard & Woodley, 2021
- Antissella ottensorum Lessard & Woodley, 2021
- Antissella parvidentata (Macquart, 1850)
- Antissella purprasina Lessard & Woodley, 2021
- Antissella quinquecella (Macquart, 1846)
