= Anacanthella =

Scientific classification
- Kingdom: Animalia
- Phylum: Arthropoda
- Clade: Pancrustacea
- Class: Insecta
- Order: Diptera
- Family: Stratiomyidae
- Subfamily: Antissinae
- Genus: Anacanthella; Macquart, 1855

Type species
- Anacanthella splendens Macquart, 1855

Synonyms
- Anachanthella Macquart, 1855

Genus of flies

Anacanthella is a genus of flies in the family Stratiomyidae.

== Species ==
- Anacanthella angustifrons (Hardy, 1932)
- Anacanthella splendens Macquart, 1855
