= Rhaphioceroides =

Scientific classification
- Kingdom: Animalia
- Phylum: Arthropoda
- Class: Insecta
- Order: Diptera
- Family: Stratiomyidae
- Subfamily: Raphiocerinae
- Tribe: Raphiocerini
- Genus: Rhaphioceroides; Brunetti, 1927

Type species
- Rhaphioceroides pendleburyi Brunetti, 1927

Genus of flies

Rhaphioceroides is a genus of flies in the family Stratiomyidae.

== Species ==
- Rhaphioceroides pendleburyi Brunetti, 1927

== Distribution ==
Thailand.
