= Cyclophleps =

Scientific classification
- Kingdom: Animalia
- Phylum: Arthropoda
- Class: Insecta
- Order: Diptera
- Family: Stratiomyidae
- Subfamily: Raphiocerinae
- Tribe: Raphiocerini
- Genus: Cyclophleps; James, 1943

Type species
- Cyclophleps tenebrifera James, 1943

Genus of flies

Cyclophleps is a genus of flies in the family Stratiomyidae.

== Species ==
- Cyclophleps tenebrifera James, 1943

== Distribution ==
Peru.
