= Analcocerini =

Scientific classification
- Kingdom: Animalia
- Phylum: Arthropoda
- Clade: Pancrustacea
- Class: Insecta
- Order: Diptera
- Family: Stratiomyidae
- Subfamily: Raphiocerinae
- Tribe: Analcocerini; Enderlein, 1914

Subfamily of flies

Analcocerini is a tribe of flies in the family Stratiomyidae.

== Genera ==
- Analcoceroides Hollis, 1963
- Analcocerus Loew, 1855
- Anisoscapus McFadden, 1970
- Auloceromyia Lindner, 1969
- Neanalcocerus James, 1943
