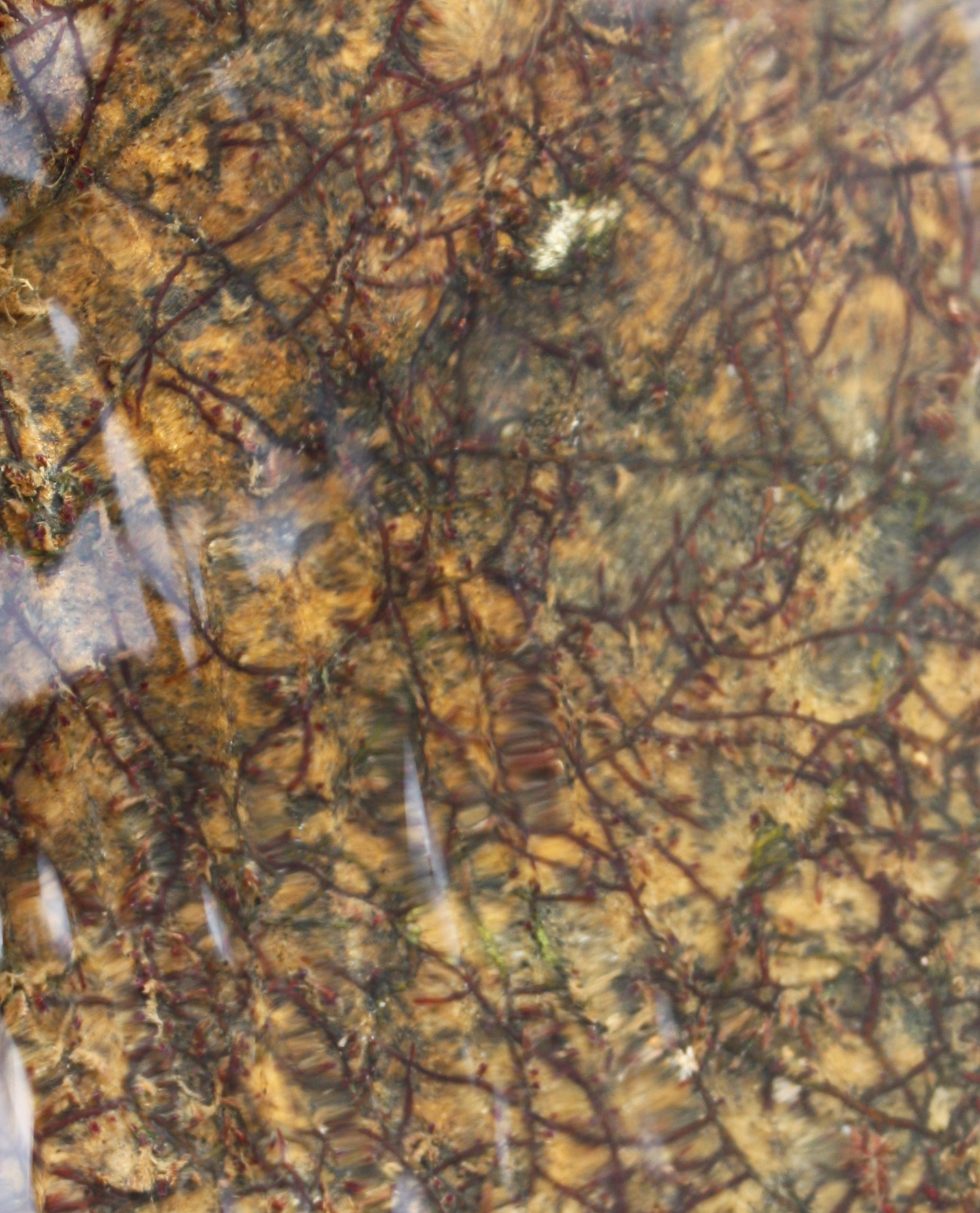
- Tristicha trifaria

Scientific classification
- Kingdom: Plantae
- Clade: Tracheophytes
- Clade: Angiosperms
- Clade: Eudicots
- Clade: Rosids
- Order: Malpighiales
- Family: Podostemaceae
- Genus: Tristicha; Thouars (1806)
- Species: T. trifaria

Binomial name
- Tristicha trifaria (Bory ex Willd.) Spreng. (1824)

Subspecies
- Tristicha trifaria subsp. pulchella (Wedd.) C.Cusset & G.Cusset; Tristicha trifaria subsp. tlatlayana (Matuda) C.Cusset & G.Cusset; Tristicha trifaria subsp. trifaria

Synonyms
- Dufourea Bory ex Willd. (1810); Heterotristicha Tobler (1953); Philocrena Bong. (1832); Potamobryon Liebm. (1847); Tristichopsis A.Chev. (1938), no Latin descr.; Dufourea trifaria Bory ex Willd. (1810)

= Tristicha =

Genus of flowering plants

Tristicha trifaria is a species of flowering plant belonging to the family Podostemaceae. It is the sole species in genus Tristicha. It is an aquatic subshrub native to the tropical and subtropical Americas, Africa, Thailand, Peninsular Malaysia, and northwestern Australia.

Tristicha is most closely related to the South American genus Mourera. The two genera appear to have an ancient divergence dating back to the mid-Cretaceous (about 100 million years ago), and may have diverged following the dispersal of their common ancestor across the incipient Antarctic land bridge. In this case, the Australian continent would have likely been the ancestral home of Tristicha.

== Subspecies ==
Three subspecies are accepted.

- Tristicha trifaria subsp. pulchella (Wedd.) C.Cusset & G.Cusset – Ivory Coast, Nigeria, Chad, Sudan, and southern Egypt
- Tristicha trifaria subsp. tlatlayana (Matuda) C.Cusset & G.Cusset – central Mexico
- Tristicha trifaria subsp. trifaria – northeastern Mexico to Northeastern Argentina; sub-Saharan Africa and Madagascar; Thailand and Peninsular Malaysia; Northern Territory and Western Australia
