= Heptozus =

Scientific classification
- Kingdom: Animalia
- Phylum: Arthropoda
- Class: Insecta
- Order: Diptera
- Family: Stratiomyidae
- Subfamily: Raphiocerinae
- Tribe: Raphiocerini
- Genus: Heptozus; Lindner, 1949

Type species
- Heptozus ecuadorianus Lindner, 1949

Genus of flies

Heptozus is a genus of flies in the family Stratiomyidae.

== Species ==
- Heptozus ecuadorianus Lindner, 1949
- Heptozus hansoni James, 1966

== Distribution ==
Mexico.
