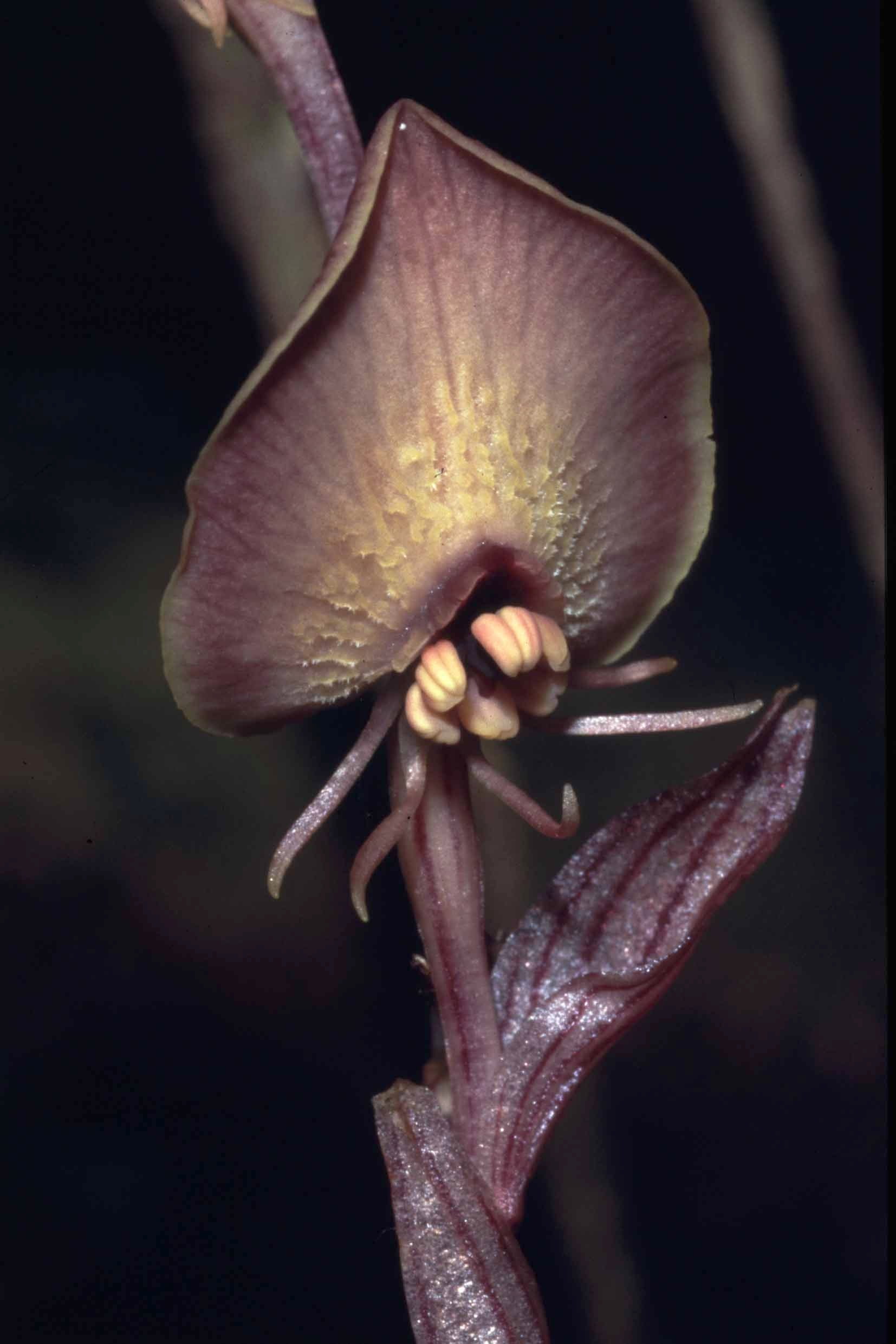

Scientific classification
- Kingdom: Plantae
- Clade: Tracheophytes
- Clade: Angiosperms
- Clade: Monocots
- Order: Liliales
- Family: Corsiaceae
- Genus: Corsia
- Species: C. ornata

Binomial name
- Corsia ornata Becc.

= Corsia ornata =

Parasitic species of flowering plant

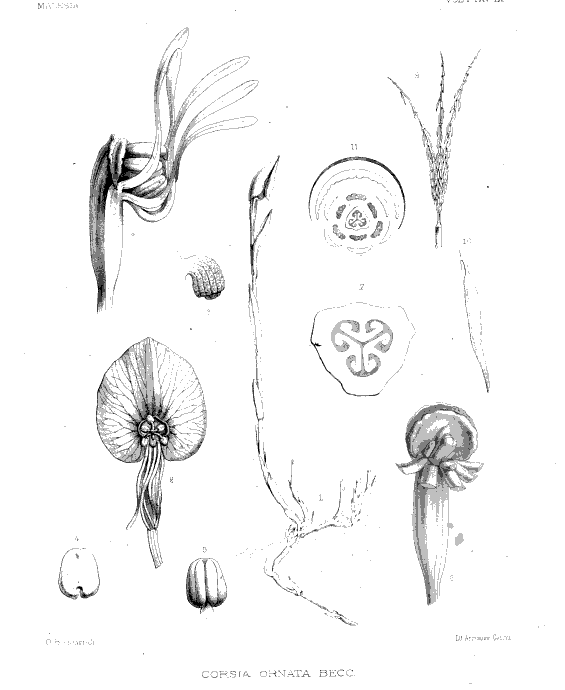
Original illustration of C. ornata. 1: Entire plant, 2: Flower with heart shaped labellum above surrounding gynostemium, remaining linear tepals below, 7,11: Diagrams of sections through ovary, 10: Seed

Corsia ornata is a species of flowering plant in the genus Corsia of the small family Corsiaceae, part of the monocot order Liliales. They are saprophytes (Myco-heterotrophs), lacking the ability to photosynthesise, being dependent on other organisms for their nutrition. The plant lives underground, sending up purplish stems above ground in order to flower. The leaves are reduced to scales. One of the six petal-like tepals named the labellum (a little lip), is specialised, being enlarged and hanging protectively over the reproductive organs. It was discovered in New Guinea in 1875, but has since been sighted in Queensland, Australia.

== Description ==
The Corsiaceae lack chlorophyll and hence the ability to photosynthesise, instead being mycoheterotrophic (deriving nutrition as parasites on fungi). C. ornata, although perennial, only appears above ground when flowering, arising from short creeping rhizomes, reaching up to 25 cm in height. From the rhizomes, arise long, cylindrical and finely corrugated, unbranched and upright growing stems that are terete (almost circular in cross section) and narrowly ribbed. The above ground portion of the plant is a purplish to purplish-red in color. Leaves are reduced to acute (sharply pointed) sheath-shaped scales 1–2 cm in length, arranged alternately on the stem, with 3–5 nerves and similar bracts. The pedicels are glabrous and 2.5–4 cm long.

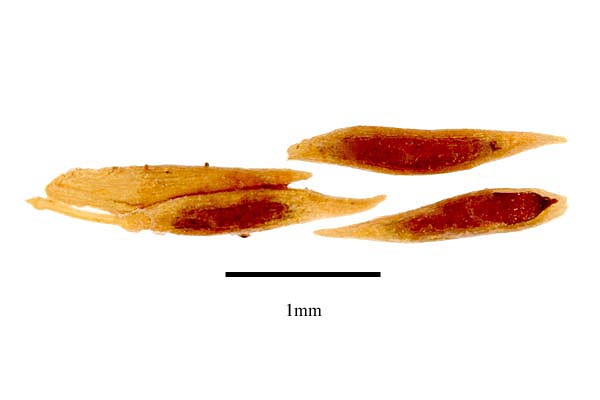
Fruit

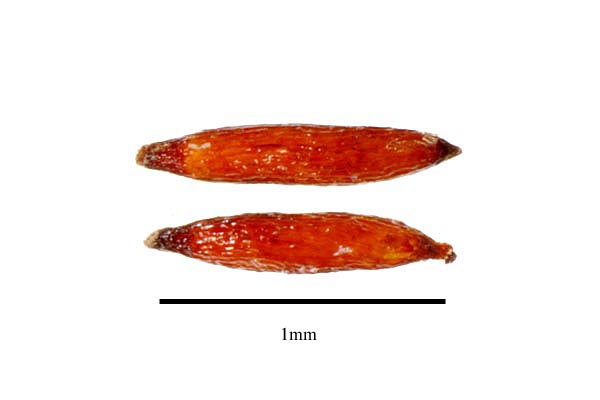
Seeds

The upright individual flowers are terminal and stand on flower stems that are 2.5–4 cm long. Of the six tepals (in two whorls), five are linear, obtuse and pale yellow in colour, 11–13 millimeters long, one-nerved and hairless. The sixth, outer tepal, called the labellum, is either light yellow to light purple with a darker purple veins nerve or purplish brown. It is greatly enlarged (1.2–1.8 cm long, 1–1.6 cm wide) and cordate (heart-shaped) and obtuse, with a cordate base. The labellum initially surrounds the flower bud and, after opening, protects the other flower organs. It has a basal callus that is white, broadly shell-shaped, 2–3.5 mm long and around 2.5 mm wide, with a tip that is rounded or slightly acuminate, finely papillate at the margins with 8 or 9 lateral nerves that are variously branched and 16–18 short lamellae radiating from the basal callus that are distinctly pilose. At the base, the labellum overhangs the reproductive organs umbrella-like, the 1 mm long gynostemium (fused stamens and pistil). The 1.5 mm filaments are dark purple, the anthers dark purple to pink, 0.5 by 1 mm. The style is about 1.5 mm in length and the capsule 2.5–3.5 cm.

== Taxonomy ==
Corsia ornata was first described by Odoardo Beccari in February 1875, and therefore bears his name (Becc.) as the botanical authority. It was the first species of the genus to be discovered and is therefore considered its type species. It is classified in the section Sessilis (named for their sessile labellum), the larger of the two sections of that genus, as one of 19 species.

== Distribution and habitat ==
Corsia ornata is found at a number of widely spaced locations in the western part of New Guinea, particularly on Bird's Head Peninsula. One sighting in Queensland, Australia, makes it the only species found outside of New Guinea. Corsia ornata occurs in forests, between 400 and 2,100 m, in humus rich soils.

== Bibliography ==
Books

- Beccari, O (1877). "Corsia ornata". Malesia: raccolta di osservazioni botaniche intorno alle piante dell'arcipelago Indo-Malese e Papuano pubblicata da Odoardo Beccari, destinata principalmente a descrivere ed illustrare le piante da esso raccolte in quelle regioni durante i viaggi eseguiti dall'anno 1865 all'anno 1878 3 vols. 1877–1889. Vol. 1. Genoa: R. Istituto Sordo-Muti. pp. 238–240, ix (Figure).
- Gibbs, Lilian S. (1917). A contribution to the phytogeography and flora of the Arfak mountains. Taylor and Francis.
- Merckx, Vincent S. F. T.; Freudenstein, John V.; Kissling, Jonathan; et al. (2013). "Taxonomy and Classification". In Merckx, Vincent (ed.). Mycoheterotrophy: the biology of plants living on fungi. New York: Springer Science+Business Media. pp. 19–101. doi:10.1007/978-1-4614-5209-6. ISBN 978-1-4614-5208-9.

Articles

- Clifford, H T; Conran, J G; Thongpukdee, A (1992). "Australian lilies: Native and naturalised species". Australian Plants. 16 (132): 343.
- Van Royen, P. (January 1972). "Sertulum Papuanum 17: Corsiaceae of New Guinea and surrounding areaS". Webbia. 27 (1): 223–255. doi:10.1080/00837792.1972.10669973.

Websites

- POWO (2020). "Corsia ornata Becc". Plants of the World Online. Royal Botanic Gardens, Kew.
- "Corsia ornata". Atlas of Living Australia. CSIRO.
- "Corsia ornata Becc". Vascular Plants: Australian Plant Name Index (APNI). Canberra: Council of Heads of Australasian Herbaria (CHAH).
