= Phanerozus =

Scientific classification
- Kingdom: Animalia
- Phylum: Arthropoda
- Class: Insecta
- Order: Diptera
- Family: Stratiomyidae
- Subfamily: Raphiocerinae
- Tribe: Raphiocerini
- Genus: Phanerozus; James, 1966

Type species
- Phanerozus rettenmeyeri James, 1966

Genus of flies

Phanerozus is a genus of flies in the family Stratiomyidae.

== Species ==
- Phanerozus pampinus (Osten Sacken, 1886)

== Distribution ==
Costa Rica, Panama.
