= Exodontha =

Scientific classification
- Kingdom: Animalia
- Phylum: Arthropoda
- Class: Insecta
- Order: Diptera
- Family: Stratiomyidae
- Subfamily: Antissinae
- Genus: Exodontha; Rondani, 1856

Synonyms
- Acanthomyia Williston, 1885; Scoliopelta Schiner, 1860

Genus of flies

Exodontha is a genus of soldier flies in the family Stratiomyidae.

== Species ==
- Exodontha dubia (Zetterstedt, 1838)
- Exodontha luteipes (Williston, 1885)
