= Denticle =

A denticle is any small tooth-like or bristle-like structure. "Denticle" may refer to:

- Denticle (tooth feature), serrations on the teeth of dinosaurs, lizards, sharks, and mammals
- Dermal denticles or placoid scales, in cartilaginous fishes
- Pulp stone or endolith, a calcified mass in the pulp of a tooth
- Numismatics, decorative teeth or saw serrations featured on a coin

== See also ==
- Denticulation (architecture)
