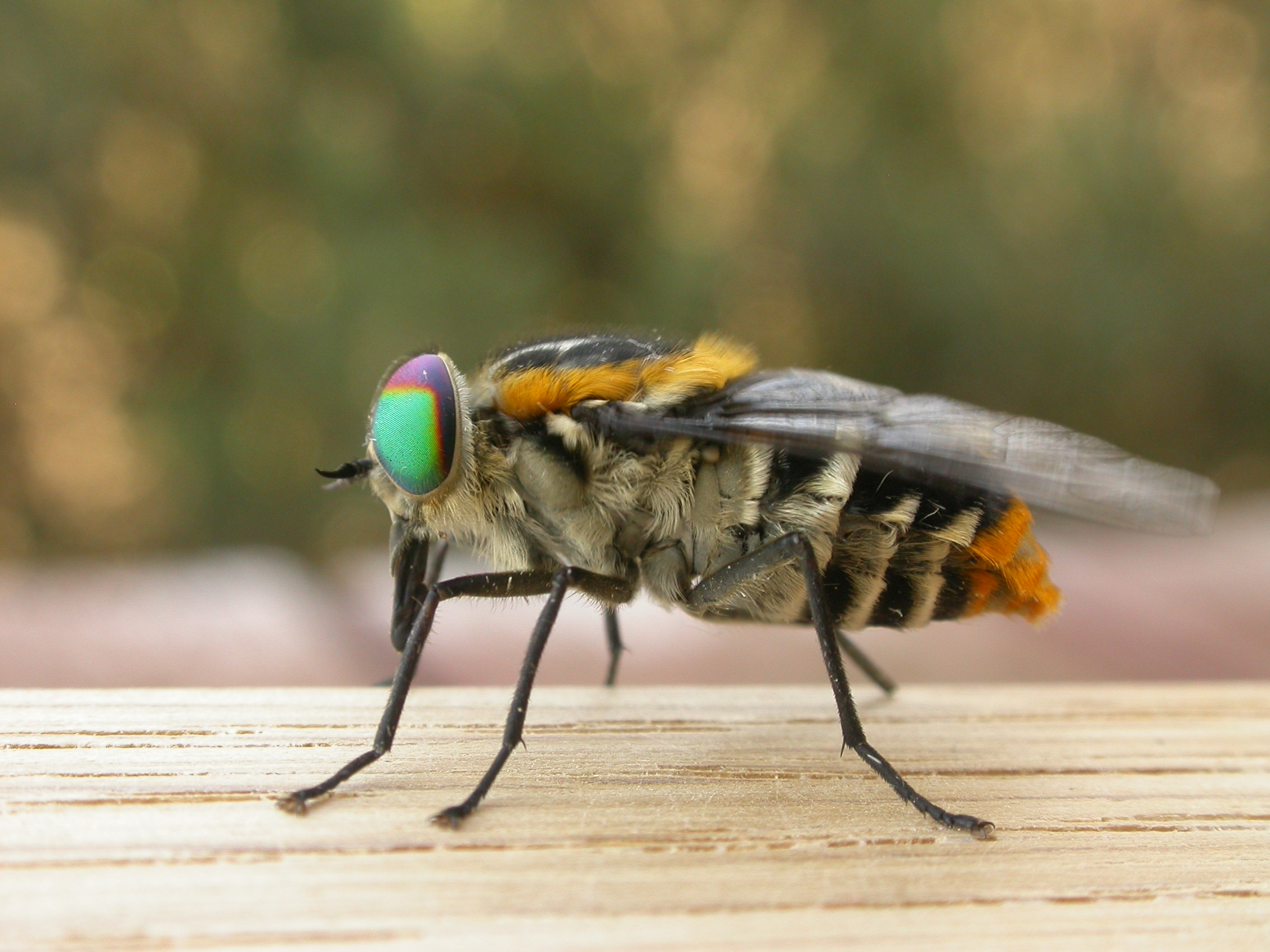
- Scaptia auriflua

Scientific classification
- Kingdom: Animalia
- Phylum: Arthropoda
- Class: Insecta
- Order: Diptera
- Family: Tabanidae
- Subfamily: Pangoniinae
- Tribe: Scionini
- Genus: Scaptia; Walker, 1850)

Type species
- Tabanus auriflua Donovan, 1805

Synonyms
- Apocampta Schiner, 1868; Triclista Enderlein, 1922; Diatomineura Rondani, 1863

= Scaptia =

Genus of flies

Scaptia is a genus of horse-fly in the tribe Scionini.

== Species ==
- Scaptia abdominalis (Ricardo, 1917)
- Scaptia alpina Mackerras, 1960
- Scaptia arnhemensis Lessard, 2012
- Scaptia auranticula Mackerras, 1960
- Scaptia aurata (Macquart, 1838)
- Scaptia aureovestita (Ferguson & Henry, 1920)
- Scaptia auriflua (Donovan, 1805)
- Scaptia aurifulga Lessard, 2011
- Scaptia aurinigra Lessard, 2013
- Scaptia aurinotum Mackerras, 1960
- Scaptia barbara Mackerras, 1960
- Scaptia berylensis (Ricardo, 1915)
- Scaptia beyonceae Lessard, 2011
- Scaptia bifasciata (Enderlein, 1922)
- Scaptia binotata Latreille, 1811
- Scaptia brevirostris (Macquart, 1850)
- Scaptia divisa (Walker, 1850)
- Scaptia fulgida (Ferguson & Henry, 1920)
- Scaptia hardyi Mackerras, 1960
- Scaptia jacksonii (Macquart, 1838)
- Scaptia jaksoniensis (Guerin, 1831)
- Scaptia minuscula Mackerras, 1960
- Scaptia monticola Mackerras, 1960
- Scaptia norrisi Mackerras, 1960
- Scaptia orba Mackerras, 1960
- Scaptia patula (Walker, 1848)
- Scaptia plana (Walker, 1848)
- Scaptia pulchra (Ricardo, 1915)
- Scaptia similis Mackerras, 1960
- Scaptia testacea (Macquart, 1838)
- Scaptia tricolor (Walker, 1848)
