= Brachygalaxias =

Scientific classification
- Kingdom: Animalia
- Phylum: Chordata
- Class: Actinopterygii
- Order: Galaxiiformes
- Family: Galaxiidae
- Subfamily: Galaxiinae
- Genus: Brachygalaxias; C. H. Eigenmann, 1928

Species
- See text.
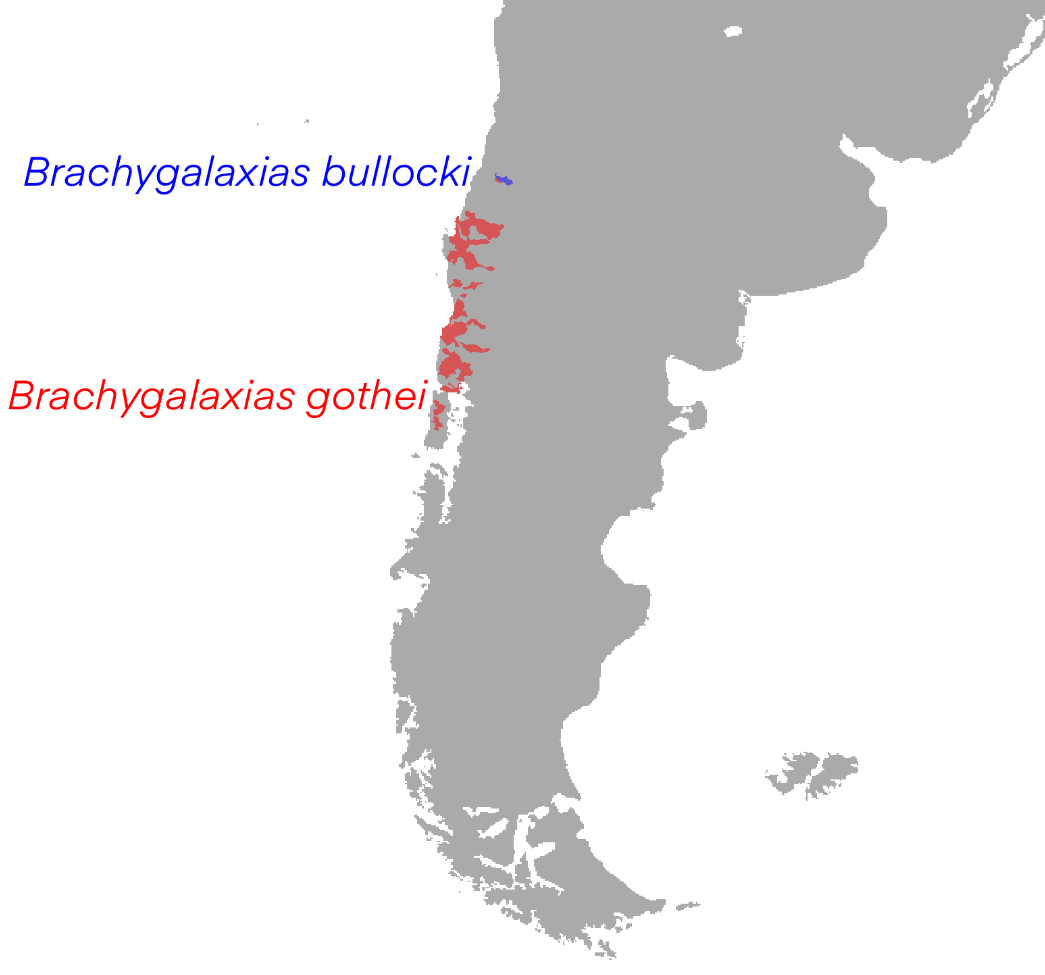

Genus of ray-finned fishes

Brachygalaxias is a genus of ray-finned fish of the family Galaxiidae with two species endemic to Chile:

- Brachygalaxias bullocki (Regan, 1908)
- Brachygalaxias gothei (Busse, 1982)
