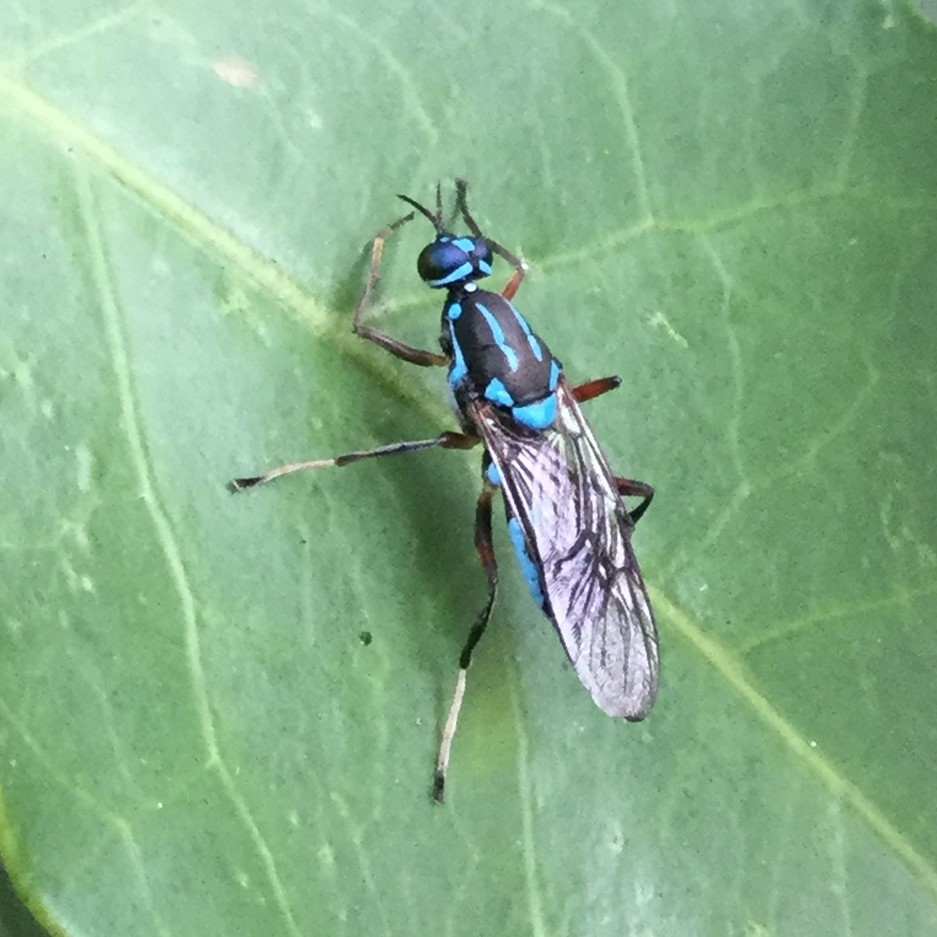

Scientific classification
- Kingdom: Animalia
- Phylum: Arthropoda
- Class: Insecta
- Order: Diptera
- Family: Stratiomyidae
- Tribe: Raphiocerini
- Genus: Brachythrix; McFadden, 1970
- Species: B. dileucostigma

Binomial name
- Brachythrix dileucostigma McFadden, 1970

= Brachythrix (fly) =

Genus of flies

Brachythrix is a genus of flies belonging to the family Stratiomyidae. It is monotypic, being represented by the single species Brachythrix dileucostigma. It is native to Mexico.
