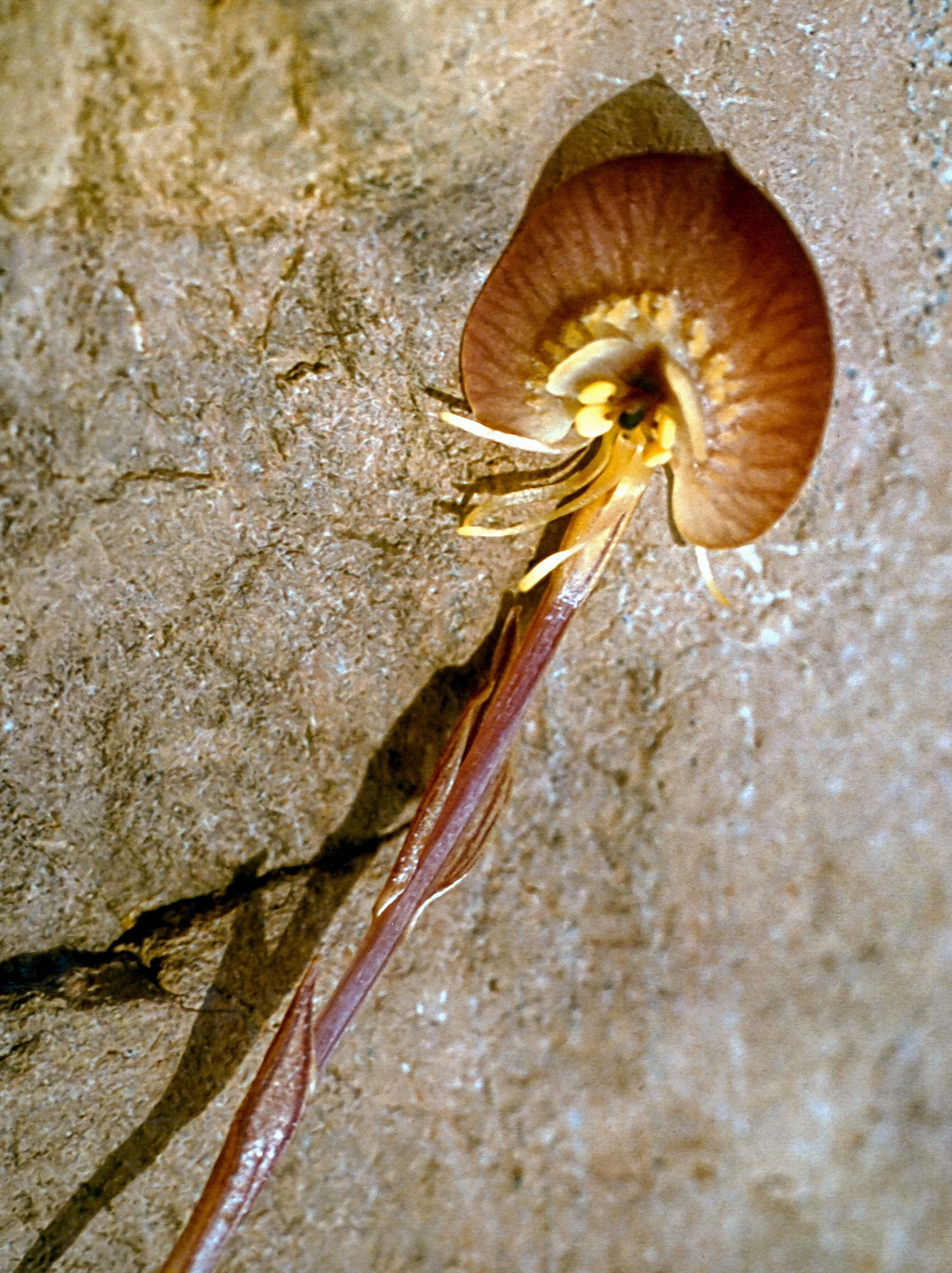
- Corsia spp.

Scientific classification
- Kingdom: Plantae
- Clade: Tracheophytes
- Clade: Angiosperms
- Clade: Monocots
- Order: Liliales
- Family: Corsiaceae; Becc.

Type genus
- Corsia Becc.

Genera
- See text

= Corsiaceae =

Family of flowering plants

Corsiaceae is a family of flowering plants comprising three genera native to China (Corsiopsis), Australasia (Corsia) and South America (Arachnitis). They have no chlorophyll and thus cannot manufacture their own food, instead they receive nutrients through a symbiotic relationship with fungi. Corsiopsis is listed as extinct by Plants of the World Online as of October 2026, but a paper published in 2025 expresses hope that the plant may be rediscovered.

== Description ==
Plants in Corsiaceae are myco-heterotrophic perennial herbs that are superficially similar to orchids. They have either rhizome-like or tuber-like roots, from which one or more unbranched pink, red or purple shoots are produced. Flowers are solitary at the top of the shoot and have six tepals in two whorls of three. The tepals are more or less identical except for one which is grossly enlarged. The flowers are bisexual in Corsia and Arachnitis, and unisexual in Corsiopsis. The fruits are capsules.

== Distribution and habitat ==
The three genera of Corsiaceae are geographically isolated, with Corsia in northeastern Australia, New Guinea and the Solomon Islands, Arachnitis in Peru, Bolivia, Argentina, Chile and the Falkland Islands, and Corsiopsis in China. They inhabit tropical and temperate forests, from lowlands to 3,000 m (9,800 ft) above sea level.

== Taxonomy ==
As of October 2026, Plants of the World Online accepts a total of 27 species across the three genera, although a revision of Corsia published in June 2026 reduced the number of species in that genus by 15.

The Angiosperm Phylogeny Group (APG) classifies the family Corsiaceae as a part of order Liliales.

=== Genera and species ===
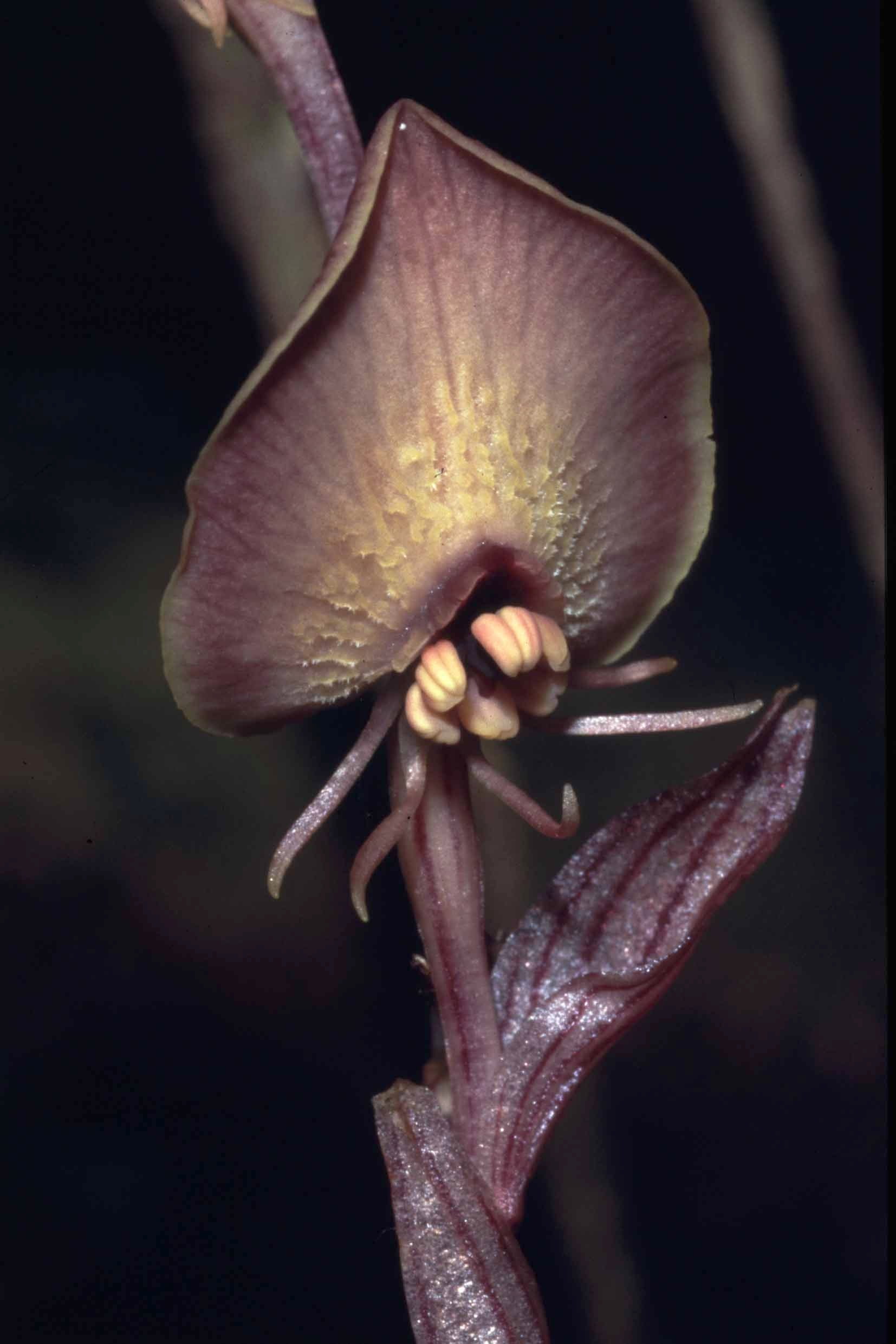
Corsia ornata, Bird's Head Peninsula, Indonesia

Arachnitis

- Arachnitis uniflora

Corsia (vide Plants of the World Online):

- Corsia acuminata
- Corsia arfakensis
- Corsia boridiensis
- Corsia brassii
- Corsia clypeata
- Corsia cordata
- Corsia cornuta
- Corsia crenata
- Corsia cyclopensis
- Corsia dispar
- Corsia haianjensis
- Corsia huonensis
- Corsia lamellata
- Corsia merimantaensis
- Corsia ornata
- Corsia papuana
- Corsia purpurata
- Corsia pyramidata
- Corsia resiensis
- Corsia torricellensis
- Corsia triceratops
- Corsia unguiculata
- Corsia viridopurpurea
- Corsia wiakabui
- Corsia wubungu

Corsia (vide Hatt & Lamei):

- Corsia acuminata
- Corsia clypeata
- Corsia cordata
- Corsia crenata
- Corsia dispar
- Corsia lamellata
- Corsia mantarayoides
- Corsia merimantaensis
- Corsia ornata
- Corsia torricellensis

Corsiopsis

- Corsiopsis chinensis

== Bibliography ==
- Neyland, R.; M. Hennigan (2003). "A phylogeny inferred from large-subunit (26S) ribosome DNA sequences suggests that the Corsiaceae are polyphyletic". New Zealand J. Bot. 41: 1–11. doi:10.1080/0028825X.2003.9512828. S2CID 84392170.
- Ibisch, Pierre L.; Neinhuis, Christoph; Rojas, N Patricia (29 November 1996). "On the Biology, Biogeography, and Taxonomy of Arachnitis Phil. nom. cons. (Corsiaceae) in Respect to a New Record from Bolivia". Willdenowia. 26 (1/2): 321–332. Bibcode:1996Willd..26..321I. doi:10.3372/wi.26.2616. JSTOR 3997251.
- Merckx, Vincent S. F. T.; Freudenstein, John V.; Kissling, Jonathan; et al. (2013). "Taxonomy and Classification". In Merckx, Vincent (ed.). Mycoheterotrophy: the biology of plants living on fungi. New York: Springer Science+Business Media. pp. 19–101. doi:10.1007/978-1-4614-5209-6. ISBN 978-1-4614-5208-9. S2CID 259078590.
