= Corsiopsis =

Scientific classification
- Kingdom: Plantae
- Clade: Tracheophytes
- Clade: Angiosperms
- Clade: Monocots
- Order: Liliales
- Family: Corsiaceae
- Genus: Corsiopsis; D.X.Zhang, R.M.K.Saunders & C.M.Hu
- Species: C. chinensis

Binomial name
- Corsiopsis chinensis D.X.Zhang, R.M.K.Saunders & C.M.Hu

Genus of flowering plants

Corsiopsis is a genus of plants in the Corsiaceae family. It contains only one known species, Corsiopsis chinensis, endemic to Guangdong Province in China.

Both the genus and the species were circumscribed by Dian Xiang Zhang, Richard M.K. Saunders and Chi-Ming Hu in Syst. Bot. vol.24 (3) on page 313 in 1999.

The genus name of Corsiopsis is in honour of Bardo Corsi Salviati (1844–1907), who was an Italian nobleman with a large botanical park near Florence.
