= Antissa (fly) =

Scientific classification
- Kingdom: Animalia
- Phylum: Arthropoda
- Class: Insecta
- Order: Diptera
- Family: Stratiomyidae
- Subfamily: Antissinae
- Genus: Antissa; Walker, 1854

Type species
- Clitellaria cuprea Walker, 1849

Synonyms
- Atissa Loew, 1860

Genus of flies

Antissa is a genus of flies in the family Stratiomyidae.

== Species ==
- Antissa cuprea (Walker, 1849)
