= Cyanauges =

Scientific classification
- Kingdom: Animalia
- Phylum: Arthropoda
- Class: Insecta
- Order: Diptera
- Family: Stratiomyidae
- Subfamily: Antissinae
- Genus: Cyanauges; Rondani, 1863

Type species
- Cynauges valdiviana Rondani, 1863

Genus of flies

Cyanauges is a genus of flies in the family Stratiomyidae.

== Species ==
- Cyanauges fuscus (James, 1973)
- Cyanauges maculatus (James, 1973)
- Cyanauges ruficornis Schiner, 1868
- Cyanauges valdivianus (Rondani, 1863)
- Cyanauges villosus (Lindner, 1969)
