= Dicranophora (fly) =

Scientific classification
- Kingdom: Animalia
- Phylum: Arthropoda
- Clade: Pancrustacea
- Class: Insecta
- Order: Diptera
- Family: Stratiomyidae
- Subfamily: Raphiocerinae
- Tribe: Raphiocerini
- Genus: Dicranophora; Macquart, 1834

Type species
- Sargus furcifer Wiedemann, 1824

Genus of flies

Dicranophora is a genus of flies in the family Stratiomyidae.

== Species ==
- Dicranophora astuta Williston, 1888
- Dicranophora furcifera (Wiedemann, 1824)
- Dicranophora picta Macquart, 1834
