= Auloceromyia =

Scientific classification
- Kingdom: Animalia
- Phylum: Arthropoda
- Class: Insecta
- Order: Diptera
- Family: Stratiomyidae
- Subfamily: Raphiocerinae
- Tribe: Analcocerini
- Genus: Auloceromyia; Lindner, 1969

Type species
- Auloceromyia vespiformis Lindner, 1969

Genus of flies

Auloceromyia is a genus of flies in the family Stratiomyidae.

== Species ==
- Auloceromyia pachypoda Fachin, 2015
- Auloceromyia pedunculata Pimentel & Pujol-Luz, 2000
- Auloceromyia vespiformis Lindner, 1969
