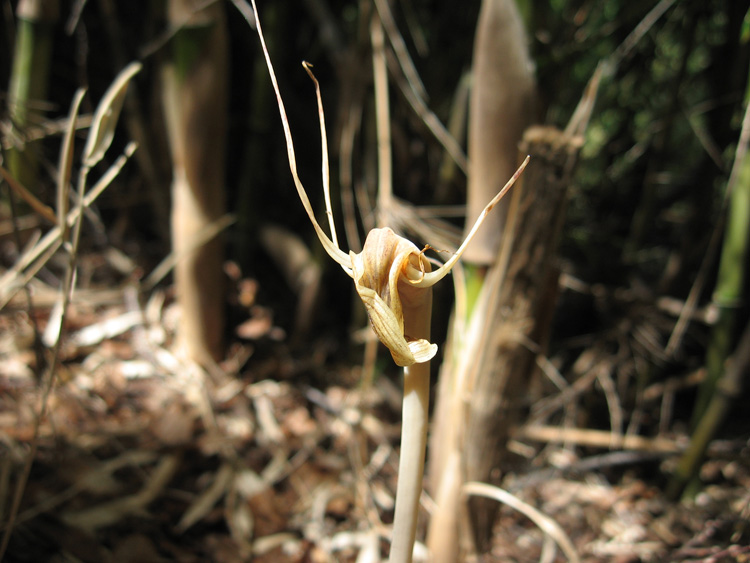

Scientific classification
- Kingdom: Plantae
- Clade: Tracheophytes
- Clade: Angiosperms
- Clade: Monocots
- Order: Liliales
- Family: Corsiaceae
- Genus: Arachnitis; Phil.
- Species: A. uniflora

Binomial name
- Arachnitis uniflora Phil.

Synonyms
- Arachnitis Kuntze; Arachnitis quetrihuensis Dimitri

= Arachnitis =

Genus of flowering plants

Arachnitis uniflora, the sole species in the genus Arachnitis, is a non-photosynthetic plant species in the family Corsiaceae. This species is mycoheterotrophic, and it obtains carbon from mycorrhizal fungi of the family Glomeraceae which are associated to its roots.

A. uniflora is native to southern South America (Bolivia, Chile, Argentina) and the Falkland Islands.

== Description ==
Although the fungi present in the roots of this species are in some ways the same kind of arbuscular mycorrhizae which are found in the roots of many plants, the details of their association with the plant roots differ in key ways (such as the absence of arbuscules).

== Bibliography ==
* Ibisch, Pierre L.; Neinhuis, Christoph; Rojas, N Patricia (29 November 1996). "On the Biology, Biogeography, and Taxonomy of Arachnitis Phil. nom. cons. (Corsiaceae) in Respect to a New Record from Bolivia". Willdenowia. 26 (1/2): 321–332. doi:10.3372/wi.26.2616. JSTOR 3997251. S2CID 4002791.
