= Antissinae =

Scientific classification
- Domain: Eukaryota
- Kingdom: Animalia
- Phylum: Arthropoda
- Class: Insecta
- Order: Diptera
- Family: Stratiomyidae
- Subfamily: Antissinae; Kertesz, 1908

Subfamily of flies

Antissinae is a subfamily of soldier flies in the family Stratiomyidae.

== Genera ==
- Anacanthella Macquart, 1855
- Antissa Walker, 1854
- Antissella White, 1914
- Cyanauges Rondani, 1863
- Discopteromyia Meijere, 1913
- Exodontha Rondani, 1856
- Lecomyia White, 1916
- Opaluma Lessard & Woodley, 2020
