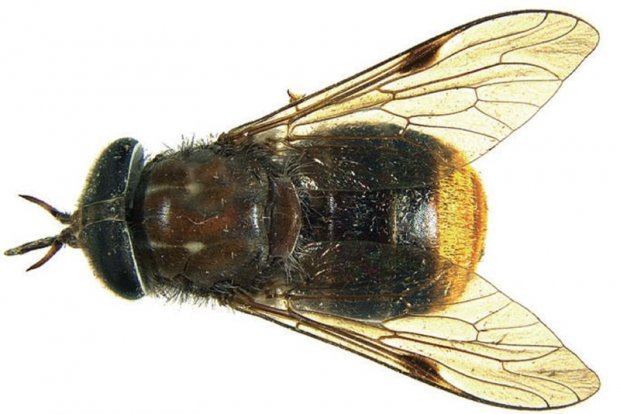

Scientific classification
- Kingdom: Animalia
- Phylum: Arthropoda
- Clade: Pancrustacea
- Class: Insecta
- Order: Diptera
- Family: Tabanidae
- Subfamily: Pangoniinae
- Tribe: Scionini
- Genus: Scaptia
- Species: S. beyonceae

Binomial name
- Scaptia beyonceae Lessard, 2011

= Scaptia beyonceae =

Species of fly

Scaptia beyonceae is a species of horse fly found in the Atherton Tablelands in north-east Queensland, Australia. Discovered in 1981 but not scientifically described until 2011, the fly is named after American musician and actress Beyoncé.

== Description ==
Scaptia beyonceae has a striking golden tip to its abdomen, formed by a dense patch of golden hairs, providing the inspiration for its name. Part of the Plinthina subgenus, S. beyonceae was first collected in 1981, along with two other previously unknown subgenus specimens; the fly was officially described in 2011 by CSIRO research scientist Bryan Lessard. According to Lessard, although usually considered by humans to be pests, many types of horse fly serve an important role in the pollination of plants. The flies drink nectar from several types of grevilleas, tea trees and eucalypts.

Other than the 1981 specimen, the fly has only been collected on two other occasions. All three collected specimens are female.

== Naming ==
The naming of animal species is required to comply with guidelines established by the International Commission on Zoological Nomenclature (ICZN). The ICZN's guidelines allow for species to receive names that honour people, including celebrities.

According to Bryan Lessard, the researcher from the Australian National Insect Collection, who was responsible for naming the fly, "It was the unique dense golden hairs on the fly’s abdomen that led me to name this fly in honour of the legendary singer, performer and actress Beyoncé as well as giving me the chance to demonstrate the fun side of taxonomy – the naming of species."

== See also ==
- List of organisms named after famous people
