= Lecomyia =

Scientific classification
- Kingdom: Animalia
- Phylum: Arthropoda
- Clade: Pancrustacea
- Class: Insecta
- Order: Diptera
- Family: Stratiomyidae
- Subfamily: Antissinae
- Genus: Lecomyia; White, 1916

Type species
- Lecogaster caerulea White, 1914

Synonyms
- Lecogaster White, 1914

Genus of flies

Lecomyia is a genus of flies in the family Stratiomyidae.

== Species ==
- Lecomyia caerulea (White, 1914)
- Lecomyia cyanea (White, 1916)
- Lecomyia notha (Hardy, 1932)
