= Thaumastocera cervaria =

Scientific classification
- Kingdom: Animalia
- Phylum: Arthropoda
- Class: Insecta
- Order: Diptera
- Family: Tabanidae
- Subfamily: Chrysopsinae
- Tribe: Rhinomyzini
- Genus: Thaumastocera
- Species: T. cervaria

Binomial name
- Thaumastocera cervaria Séguy, 1935

Synonyms
- Thaumastocera boueti Séguy, 1947

Species of fly

Thaumastocera cervaria is a species of Horse fly in the family Tabanidae.

== Distribution ==
Angola & Ghana & Congo.
