= Acanthonotozoma =

Acanthonotozomatidae

Scientific classification
- Kingdom: Animalia
- Phylum: Arthropoda
- Clade: Pancrustacea
- Class: Malacostraca
- Order: Amphipoda
- Superfamily: Iphimedioidea
- Family: Acanthonotozomatidae; Stebbing, 1906
- Genus: Acanthonotozoma; Boeck, 1876

Family of crustaceans

Acanthonotozomatidae is a family of amphipod crustaceans, which currently comprises the single genus Acanthonotozoma Boeck, 1876.
