= Agrilus sayi =

Scientific classification
- Kingdom: Animalia
- Phylum: Arthropoda
- Clade: Pancrustacea
- Class: Insecta
- Order: Coleoptera
- Suborder: Polyphaga
- Infraorder: Elateriformia
- Family: Buprestidae
- Genus: Agrilus
- Species: A. sayi

Binomial name
- Agrilus sayi Saunders, 1870

Synonyms
- Agrilus browni Carlson and Knight, 1969

Species of beetle

Agrilus sayi, the bayberry agrilus, is a species of metallic wood-boring beetle in the family Buprestidae. It is found in North America.
