= Chrysaspis =

Chrysaspis may refer to:

- Chrysaspis (beetle) Saunders, 1869, a genus of beetles in the family Buprestidae
- Chrysaspis (wasp) Saussure 1887, a genus of wasps, synonym of Chrysis Linnaeus, 1761
- Clover (Trifolium syn. Chrysaspis), a genus of plant in the family Fabaceae
