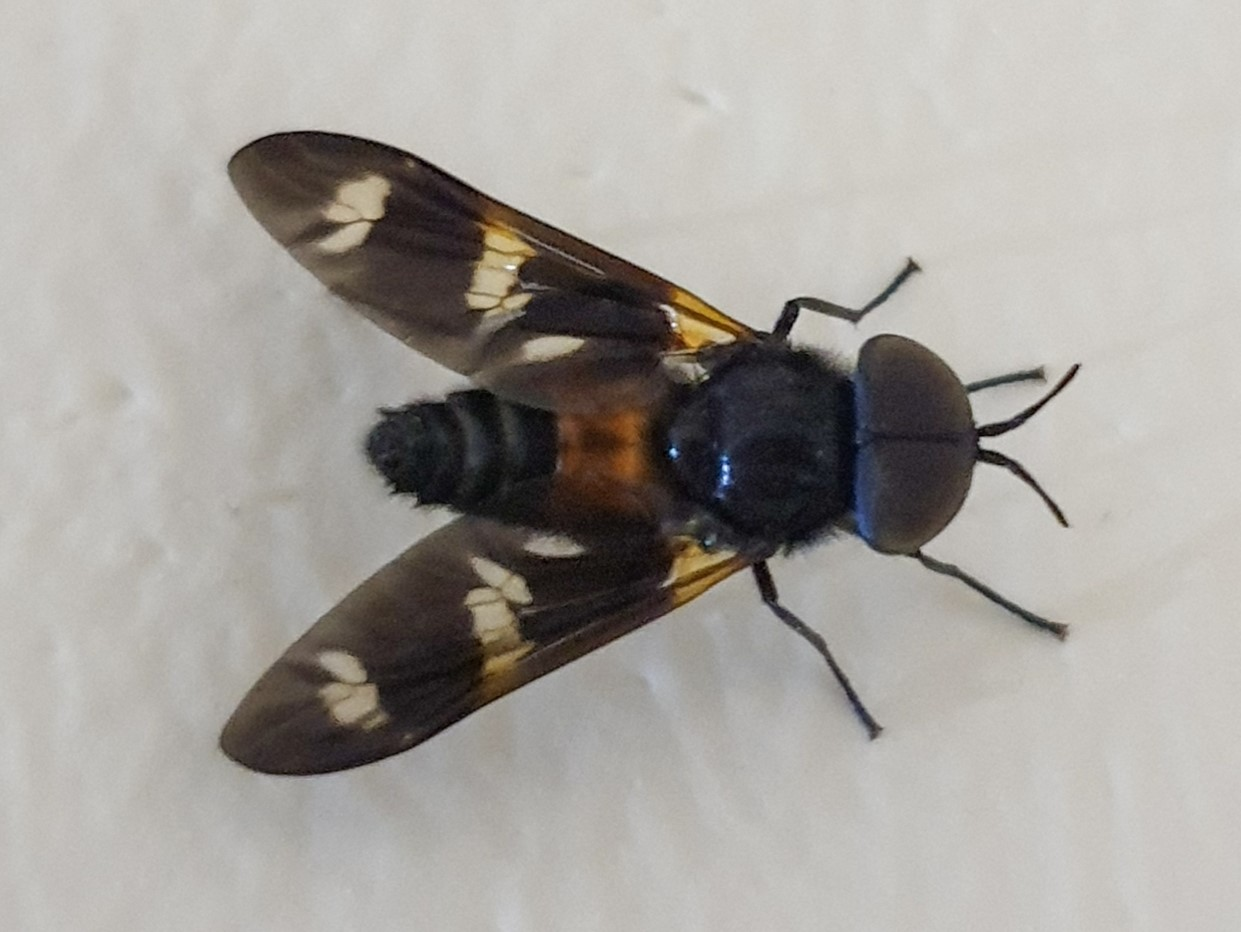
- Gastroxides ornatus

Scientific classification
- Kingdom: Animalia
- Phylum: Arthropoda
- Clade: Pancrustacea
- Class: Insecta
- Order: Diptera
- Family: Tabanidae
- Subfamily: Chrysopsinae
- Tribe: Rhinomyzini
- Genus: Gastroxides; Saunders, 1842

Type species
- Gastroxides ater Saunders, 1842

Synonyms
- Ditilomyia Schiner, 1868; Ditylomyia Bigot, 1859

= Gastroxides =

Genus of insects

Gastroxides is a genus of horse flies in the family Tabanidae. This genus possesses three closely placed ocelli at the vertex of the head, between the compound eyes.

== Species ==
- Gastroxides ater Saunders, 1842 - India
- Gastroxides ornatus (Bigot, 1859) - Sri Lanka, South India
- Gastroxides shirakii Ôuchi, 1939 - China
