= Thaumastocera akwa =

Scientific classification
- Kingdom: Animalia
- Phylum: Arthropoda
- Class: Insecta
- Order: Diptera
- Family: Tabanidae
- Subfamily: Chrysopsinae
- Tribe: Rhinomyzini
- Genus: Thaumastocera
- Species: T. akwa

Binomial name
- Thaumastocera akwa Grünberg, 1906

Synonyms
- Thaumastocera vittata Surcouf, 1923

Species of fly

Thaumastocera akwa is a species of Horse fly in the family Tabanidae.

== Distribution ==
Guinea & Sierra Leone to Uganda & Congo.
