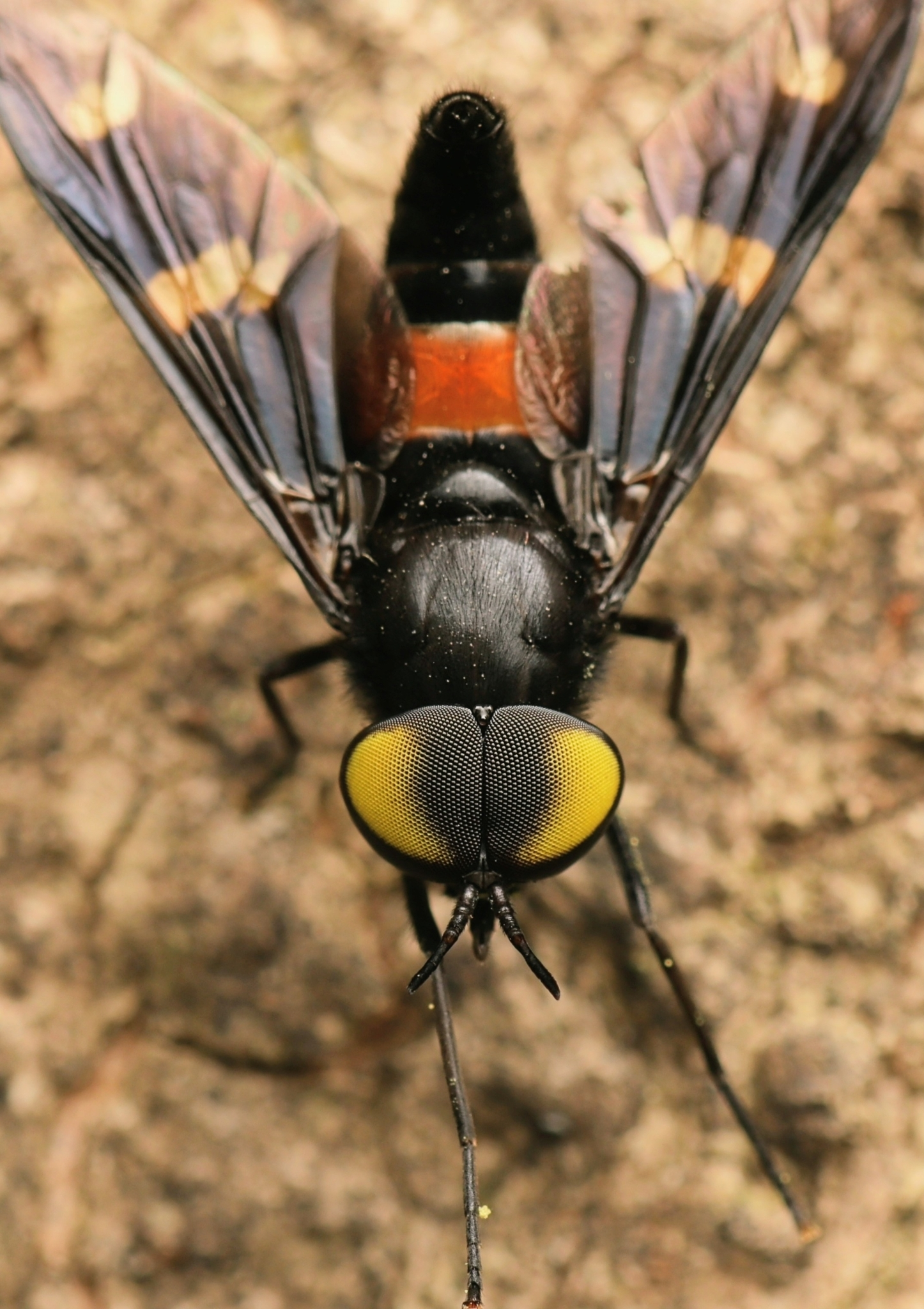
- Male

Scientific classification
- Kingdom: Animalia
- Phylum: Arthropoda
- Clade: Pancrustacea
- Class: Insecta
- Order: Diptera
- Family: Tabanidae
- Genus: Gastroxides
- Species: G. ater

Binomial name
- Gastroxides ater Saunders, 1842

= Gastroxides ater =

Species of fly

Gastroxides ater is a species of horsefly found in India. The larvae live in humus, tree-holes etc. and feed on organisms in the moist debris. The pupae take six days and the adults emerge mainly in June and July. The male has a reddish yellow band on the abdomen. They complete only one life-cycle a year and the larvae grow very slowly and undergo a diapause in the dry season. The larva is 2.4 cm long, yellowish to orange and the black pupa is also found inside wet tree holes. The pupal period is a week.

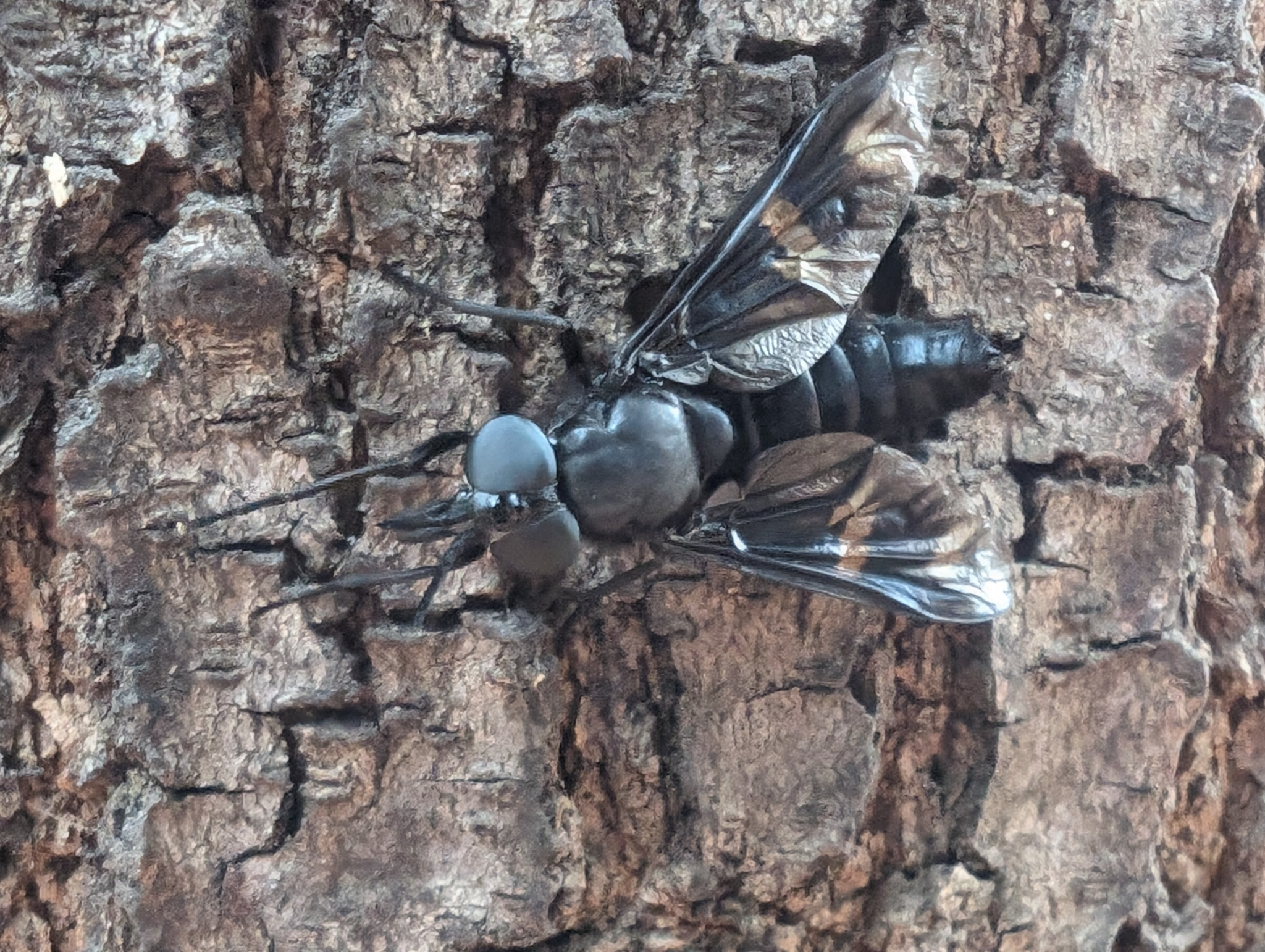
The female lacks the band on the abdomen

Saunders created the genus Gastroxides on the basis of this species. His type specimen came from "northern India" and was a female with completely black abdomen (ater referring in Latin to black) and a few years later he saw a male in the collections of Colonel Hearsey with a "rufous" band. He described the genus as having three ocelli on the vertex of the head and also separated it from the genus Tabanus based on relative sizes of the three segments of the ringed antenna and the shape of the abdomen.
