= Haustorius canadensis =

Scientific classification
- Domain: Eukaryota
- Kingdom: Animalia
- Phylum: Arthropoda
- Class: Malacostraca
- Order: Amphipoda
- Family: Haustoriidae
- Genus: Haustorius
- Species: H. canadensis

Binomial name
- Haustorius canadensis Bousfield, 1962

Species of crustacean

Haustorius canadensis is a species of amphipod in the family Haustoriidae.
