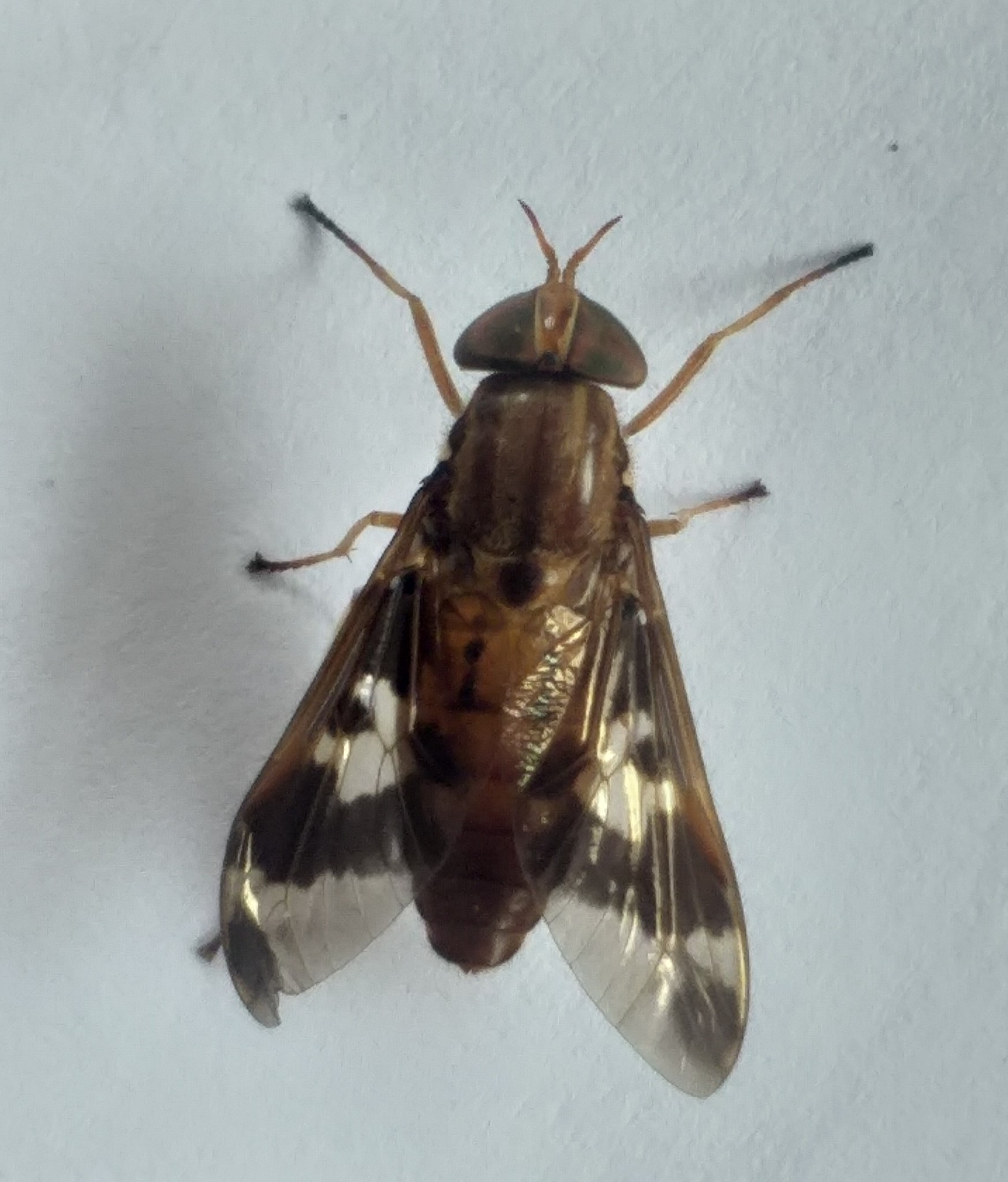

Scientific classification
- Kingdom: Animalia
- Phylum: Arthropoda
- Class: Insecta
- Order: Diptera
- Family: Tabanidae
- Subfamily: Chrysopsinae
- Tribe: Rhinomyzini
- Genus: Tabanocella
- Species: T. denticornis

Binomial name
- Tabanocella denticornis (Wiedemann, 1828)

Synonyms
- Silvius denticornis Wiedemann, 1828; Dichelacera binotata Macquart, 1838

= Tabanocella denticornis =

Species of fly

Tabanocella denticornis is a species of horse fly in the family Tabanidae.

== Distribution ==
Mozambique, Zimbabwe.
