= Idunella sketi =

Conservation status
- Critically Endangered (IUCN 2.3)

Scientific classification
- Kingdom: Animalia
- Phylum: Arthropoda
- Class: Malacostraca
- Order: Amphipoda
- Family: Liljeborgiidae
- Genus: Idunella
- Species: I. sketi

Binomial name
- Idunella sketi Karaman, 1980

Species of crustacean

Idunella sketi is a species of crustacean in family Liljeborgiidae. It is endemic to Bermuda.
