= Dulcibella =

Scientific classification
- Kingdom: Animalia
- Phylum: Arthropoda
- Clade: Pancrustacea
- Class: Malacostraca
- Order: Amphipoda
- Family: Eusiridae
- Genus: Dulcibella; Weston & González, 2024
- Species: D. camanchaca

Binomial name
- Dulcibella camanchaca Weston & González, 2024

Species of amphipod

Dulcibella camanchaca is a species of amphipod in the monotypic genus Dulcibella. The species inhabits the Atacama Trench, and is found at depths of nearly 8,000 m (26,000 ft) in the South Pacific Ocean near Chile; this makes it one of the deepest-living predators identified to date, being well adapted to the extreme conditions of the hadal zone.

The genus name Dulcibella derives from Dulcinea of Don Quixote, consistent with two morphologically similar amphipod genera named after characters from Don Quixote: Cleonardo Stebbing 1888 (Note: Stebbing writes 'The generic name is taken from a personal name in Don Quixote.' Cleonardo, a character in an imitation of Don Quixote, corresponds to Clenardo, in the original Don Quixote, part 1, chapter 29.) and Dorotea Corbari, Frutos & Sorbe 2019. The name Dulcinea was already a genus of Coleoptera. Dulcibella appears in medieval English literature. The specific epithet camanchaca originates from the Aymara word kamanchaka "darkness", referencing its deep-sea habitat.

== Discovery ==
The species was first observed during a 2023 oceanographic expedition, in the process of installing the Integrated Deep-Ocean Observing System (IDOOS), a network of sensors designed to aid scientific research within the Atacama Trench. The research team used benthic landers to collect specimens from depths nearing 8,000 meters (26,000 ft); for comparison, the altitude of Mount Everest is just over 8,800 meters (28,900 ft). Four specimens were used to describe the species.

In 2024, Dulcibella camanchaca was formally described by marine biologists Johanna Weston and Carolina González. The identification of D. camanchaca as a new species was confirmed through DNA analysis and detailed morphological examination. This discovery has contributed to the growing recognition of the Atacama Trench as a region of high biodiversity and endemism.

Continued exploration of these regions is expected to yield further insights into the adaptations and biodiversity of organisms living in extreme conditions.

== Description ==
Dulcibella camanchaca is larger than most other amphipods found at similar depths, measuring approximately 4 cm (1.6 in) in length. It exhibits predatory behavior, using specialized appendages to capture and consume smaller crustaceans, which suggest an ecological role as an active predator in the hadal zone.
