= Haustoriidae =

Scientific classification
- Kingdom: Animalia
- Phylum: Arthropoda
- Clade: Pancrustacea
- Class: Malacostraca
- Order: Amphipoda
- Parvorder: Haustoriidira
- Superfamily: Haustorioidea
- Family: Haustoriidae; Stebbing, 1906

Genera
- See text.

Family of crustaceans

Haustoriidae is a family of amphipods. They are very distinctive stout-bodied burrowing animals.

The following genera are included in the family:

- Acanthohaustorius Bousfield, 1965
- Cunicus
- Eohaustorius J. L. Barnard, 1957
- Haustorius P. L. St. Muller, 1775
- Lepidactylus Say, 1818
- Neohaustorius Bousfield, 1965
- Parahaustorius Bousfield, 1971
- Protohaustorius Bonsfield, 1965
- Pseudohaustorius Bousfield, 1965
