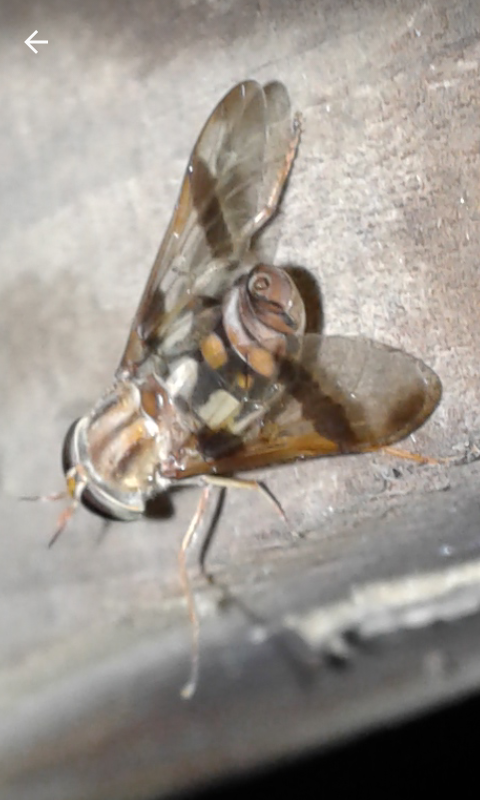
- Tabanocella zoulouensis

Scientific classification
- Kingdom: Animalia
- Phylum: Arthropoda
- Class: Insecta
- Order: Diptera
- Family: Tabanidae
- Subfamily: Chrysopsinae
- Tribe: Rhinomyzini
- Genus: Tabanocella; Bigot, 1856

Type species
- Silvius denticornis Wiedemann, 1828)

Synonyms
- Tabanocellinus Dias, 1966

= Tabanocella =

Genus of insects

Tabanocella is a genus of horse flies in the family Tabanidae.

== Species ==
The following species are recognised in the genus Tabanocella:

- Tabanocella alveolata (Surcouf, 1909)
- Tabanocella bilineata Oldroyd, 1957
- Tabanocella bimaculata Zeegers, 2017
- Tabanocella conciliatrix Dias, 1960
- Tabanocella concinna (Austen, 1910)
- Tabanocella denticornis (Wiedemann, 1828)
- Tabanocella fenestrata (Séguy, 1934)
- Tabanocella grenieri Dias, 1956
- Tabanocella guineensis Dias, 1959
- Tabanocella hauseri Zeegers, 2017
- Tabanocella immaculata Oldroyd, 1957
- Tabanocella innotata (Karsch, 1888)
- Tabanocella longirostris (Bigot, 1859)
- Tabanocella maculata (Surcouf, 1909)
- Tabanocella metallica Oldroyd, 1957
- Tabanocella micromera Oldroyd, 1963
- Tabanocella mordosa (Austen, 1912)
- Tabanocella natalensis Oldroyd, 1957
- Tabanocella oldroydi Grenier & Rageau, 1955
- Tabanocella paulyi Leclercq, 1988
- Tabanocella perpulcra (Austen, 1910)
- Tabanocella quentini Zeegers, 2017
- Tabanocella schofieldi Usher, 1965
- Tabanocella schoutedeni Fain, 1947
- Tabanocella scirpea Oldroyd, 1957
- Tabanocella seguyi (Quentin, 1990)
- Tabanocella seyrigi Séguy, 1951
- Tabanocella sinuata Oldroyd, 1957
- Tabanocella stigmatana (Séguy, 1934)
- Tabanocella stimulans (Austen, 1910)
- Tabanocella stuckenbergi Oldroyd, 1957
- Tabanocella thoracica Séguy, 1951
- Tabanocella umbraticola (Austen, 1911)
- Tabanocella viettei (Quentin, 1990)
- Tabanocella zoulouensis (Ricardo, 1914)
- BOLD:ADY9736 (Tabanocella sp.)
