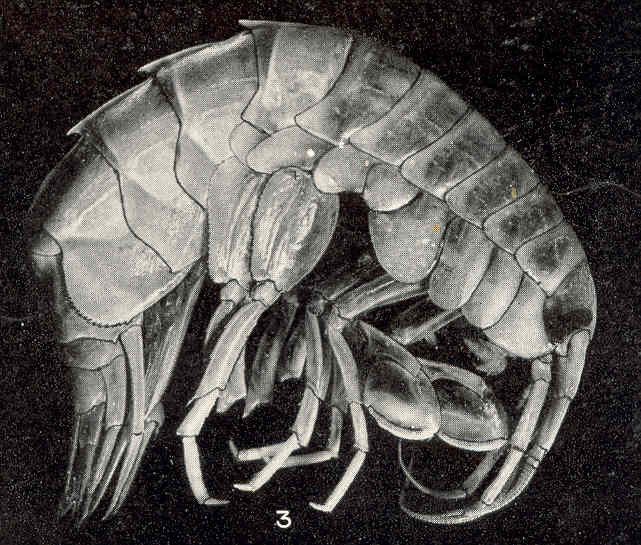

Scientific classification
- Kingdom: Animalia
- Phylum: Arthropoda
- Class: Malacostraca
- Order: Amphipoda
- Family: Eusiridae
- Genus: Eusirus; Krøyer, 1845

= Eusirus =

Genus of crustaceans

Eusirus is a genus of amphipods belonging to the family Eusiridae. The genus has cosmopolitan distribution. Within the genus Eusirus sexual dimorphism is weak, therefore identifying the sex of non-adult individuals is difficult.

== Species ==
The following species are recognised:

- Eusirus abyssi Stephensen, 1944
- Eusirus antarcticus Thomson, 1880
- Eusirus bathybius Schellenberg, 1955
- Eusirus biscayensis Bonnier, 1896
- Eusirus bonnieri Othaitz & Sorbe, 2020
- Eusirus bouvieri Chevreux, 1911
- Eusirus bulbodigitus Jung, Kim, Soh & Yoon, 2016
- Eusirus columbianus Bousfield & Hendrycks, 1995
- Eusirus crosnieri Ledoyer, 1978
- Eusirus cuspidatus Krøyer, 1845
- Eusirus fragilis Birstein & M. Vinogradov, 1960
- Eusirus giganteus Andres, Lörz & Brandt, 2002
- Eusirus hirayamai Bousfield & Hendrycks, 1995
- Eusirus holmii Hansen, 1887
- Eusirus laevis Walker, 1903
- Eusirus laticarpus Chevreux, 1906
- Eusirus latirostris Ledoyer, 1982
- Eusirus leptocarpus G.O. Sars, 1893
- Eusirus liui Wang, Sha & Ren, 2021
- Eusirus longipes Boeck, 1861
- Eusirus meteorae Andres, 1996
- Eusirus microps Walker, 1906
- Eusirus minutus G.O. Sars, 1893
- Eusirus nevandis J.L. Barnard, 1961
- Eusirus parvus Pirlot, 1934
- Eusirus perdentatus Chevreux, 1912
- Eusirus pontomedon Verheye & d'Udekem d'Acoz, 2020
- Eusirus propeperdentatus Andres, 1979
- Eusirus propinqvus G.O. Sars, 1893
- Eusirus tjalfiensis Stephensen, 1912
- Eusirus tridentatus Bellan-Santini & Ledoyer, 1974
