= Liljeborgiidae =

Scientific classification
- Kingdom: Animalia
- Phylum: Arthropoda
- Clade: Pancrustacea
- Class: Malacostraca
- Order: Amphipoda
- Parvorder: Eusiridira
- Superfamily: Liljeborgioidea
- Family: Liljeborgiidae; Stebbing, 1899

Genera
- See text

Family of crustaceans

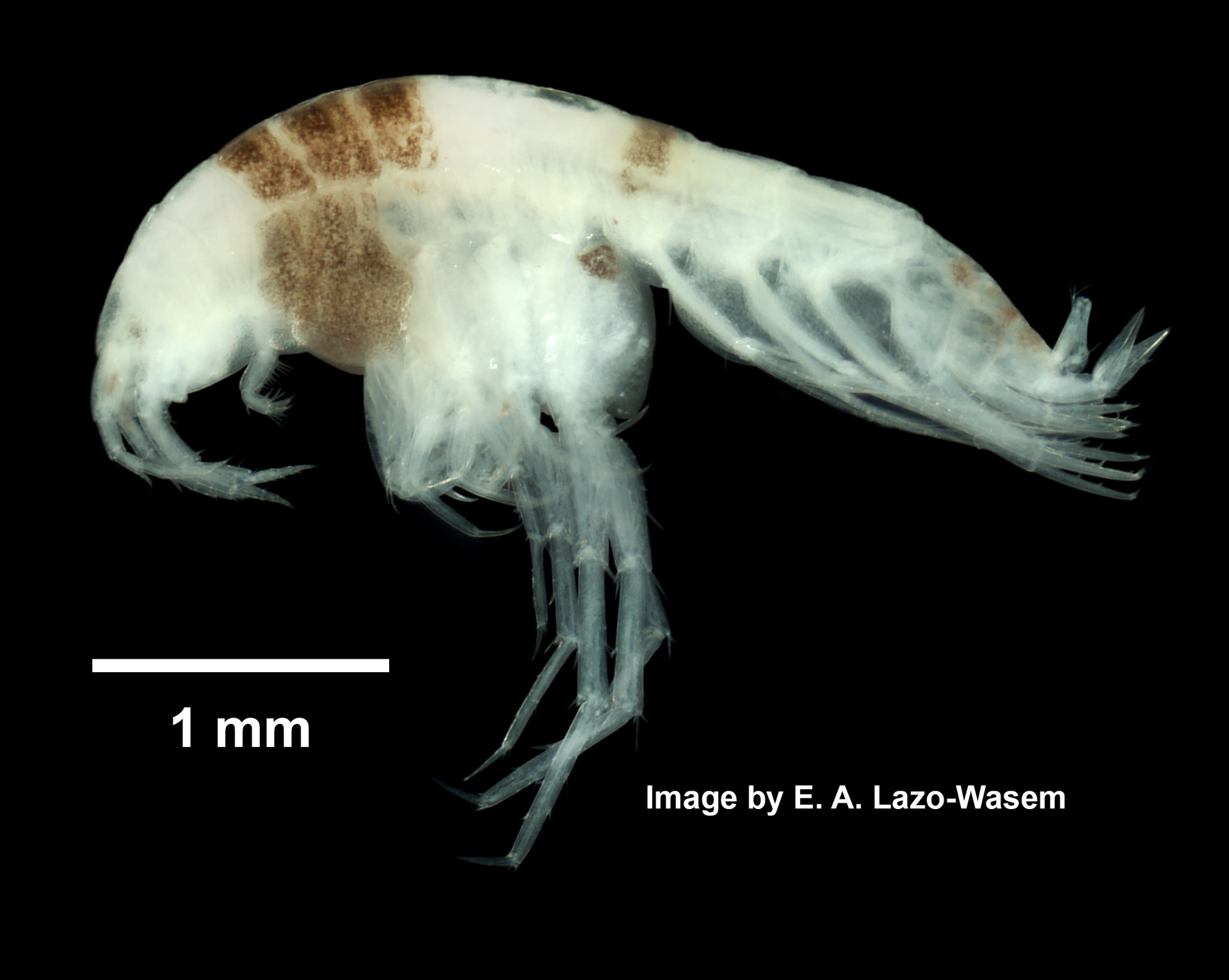

Liljeborgiidae is a family of amphipods, containing the following genera:

- Idunella G. O. Sars, 1894
- Sextonia Chevreux, 1920
- Liljeborgia Bate, 1862
