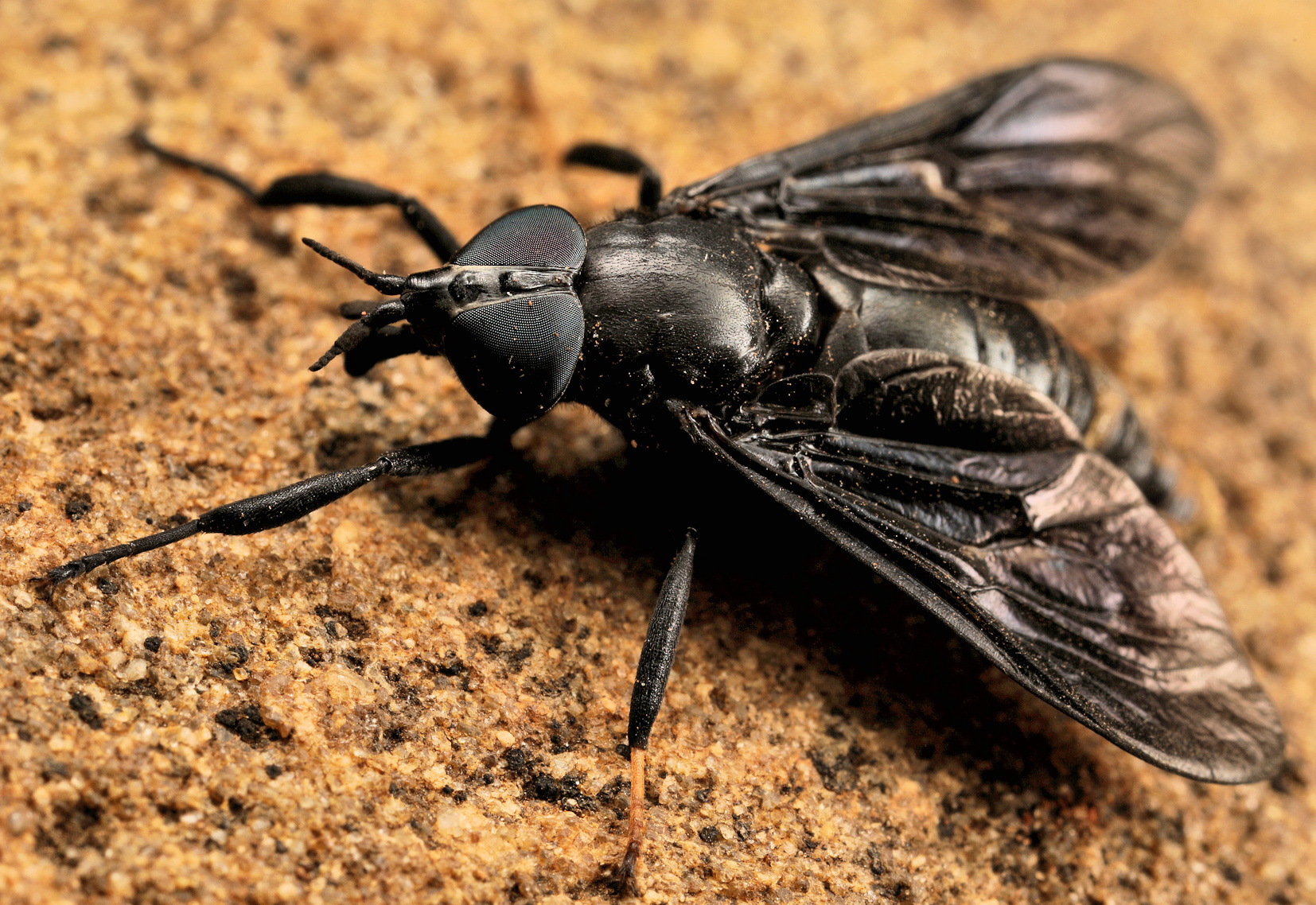
- Jashinea lugubris

Scientific classification
- Kingdom: Animalia
- Phylum: Arthropoda
- Class: Insecta
- Order: Diptera
- Family: Tabanidae
- Subfamily: Chrysopsinae
- Tribe: Rhinomyzini
- Genus: Jashinea; Oldroyd, 1970

Type species
- Jashinea flavipes Adams, 1905

Synonyms
- Hinea Adams, 1905

= Jashinea =

Genus of insects

Jashinea is a genus of horse flies in the family Tabanidae.

== Species ==
- Jashinea aurantiaca Fain & Elsen, 1981
- Jashinea engleberti Leclercq, 1991
- Jashinea jacoti (Bouvier, 1936)
- Jashinea lugubris (Austen, 1937)
- Jashinea pertusa (Loew, 1858)
- Jashinea praestabilis (Grünberg, 1913)
- Jashinea rodhaini (Bequaert, 1913)
