= Rhinomyza =

Scientific classification
- Kingdom: Animalia
- Phylum: Arthropoda
- Class: Insecta
- Order: Diptera
- Family: Tabanidae
- Subfamily: Chrysopsinae
- Tribe: Rhinomyzini
- Genus: Rhinomyza; Wiedemann, 1820

Type species
- Rhinomyza fusca Wiedemann, 1820

Synonyms
- Khinomyza Jensen, 1832; Rhinomyza Jensen, 1832

Genus of flies

Rhinomyza is a genus of horse flies in the family Tabanidae.

== Species ==
- Rhinomyza atricincta(Schuurmans Stekhoven, 1928)
- Rhinomyza cincta Philip, 1960
- Rhinomyza fusca Wiedemann, 1820
- Rhinomyza oculata Philip & Mackerras, 1960
