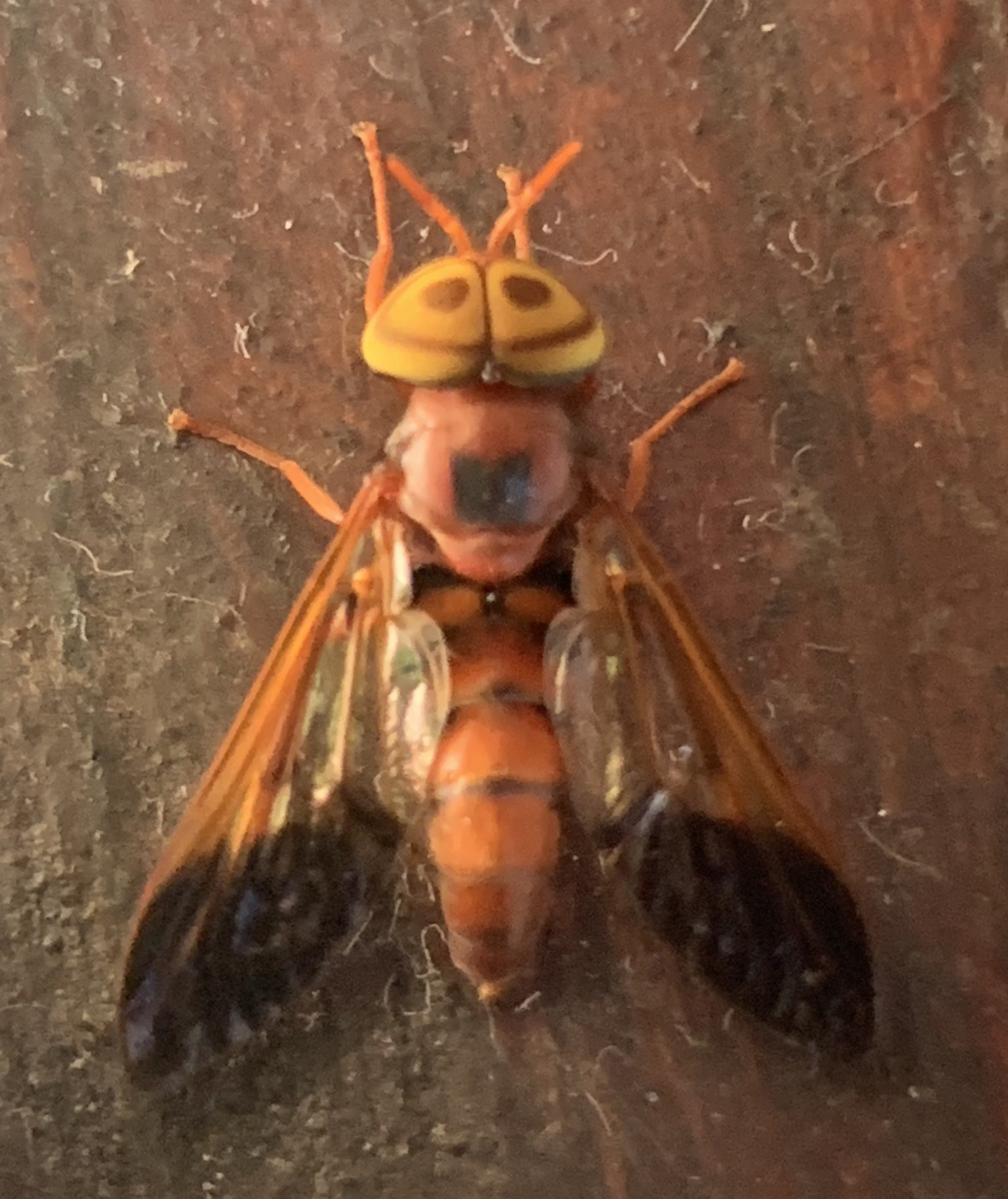
- Sphecodemyia lamborni

Scientific classification
- Kingdom: Animalia
- Phylum: Arthropoda
- Class: Insecta
- Order: Diptera
- Family: Tabanidae
- Subfamily: Chrysopsinae
- Tribe: Rhinomyzini
- Genus: Sphecodemyia; Austen, 1937

Type species
- Sphecodemyia lamborni Austen, 1937

= Sphecodemyia =

Genus of flies

Sphecodemyia is a genus of flies in the family Tabanidae.

== Species ==
- Sphecodemyia gromieri Oldroyd, 1957
- Sphecodemyia infuscata Oldroyd, 1957
- Sphecodemyia lamborni Austen, 1937
- Sphecodemyia natalensis Oldroyd, 1957
- Sphecodemyia secunda Austen, 1937
