= Orgizomyia =

Scientific classification
- Kingdom: Animalia
- Phylum: Arthropoda
- Class: Insecta
- Order: Diptera
- Family: Tabanidae
- Subfamily: Chrysopsinae
- Tribe: Rhinomyzini
- Genus: Orgizomyia; Grünberg, 1906

Type species
- Pangonia zigzag Macquart, 1855

Synonyms
- Methoria Surcouf, 1909

Genus of insects

Orgizomyia is a genus of horse flies in the family Tabanidae.

== Distribution ==
Madagascar.

== Species ==
- Orgizomyia zigzag (Macquart, 1855)
