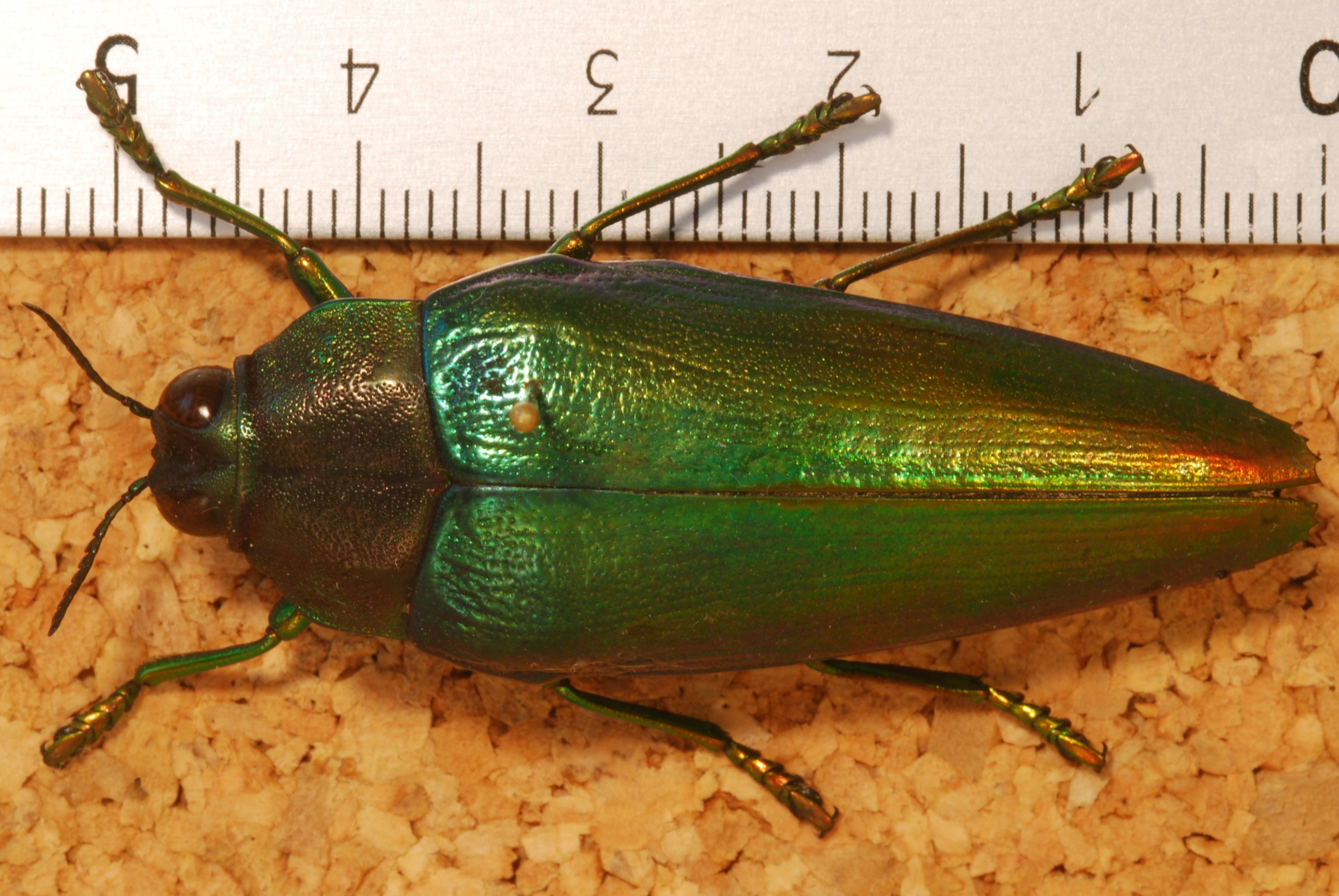
- Chrysaspis viridipennis

Scientific classification
- Kingdom: Animalia
- Phylum: Arthropoda
- Clade: Pancrustacea
- Class: Insecta
- Order: Coleoptera
- Suborder: Polyphaga
- Infraorder: Elateriformia
- Family: Buprestidae
- Genus: Chrysaspis; Saunders, 1869

= Chrysaspis (beetle) =

Genus of beetles

Chrysaspis is a genus of beetles in the family Buprestidae, containing the following species:

- Chrysaspis armata Kerremans, 1891
- Chrysaspis auricauda Saunders, 1872
- Chrysaspis aurovittata (Saunders, 1867)
- Chrysaspis bennettii Waterhouse, 1904
- Chrysaspis cuneata Harold, 1878
- Chrysaspis cupreomicans Kerremans, 1895
- Chrysaspis elongata (Olivier, 1790)
- Chrysaspis glabra Waterhouse, 1904
- Chrysaspis higletti Waterhouse, 1904
- Chrysaspis ignipennis Harold, 1879
- Chrysaspis luluensis (Burgeon, 1941)
- Chrysaspis overlaeti (Burgeon, 1941)
- Chrysaspis propinqua Saunders, 1874
- Chrysaspis schoutedeni (Théry, 1926)
- Chrysaspis schultzei Kolbe, 1907
- Chrysaspis splendens (Nonfried, 1892)
- Chrysaspis tincta Waterhouse, 1904
- Chrysaspis viridipennis Saunders, 1869
