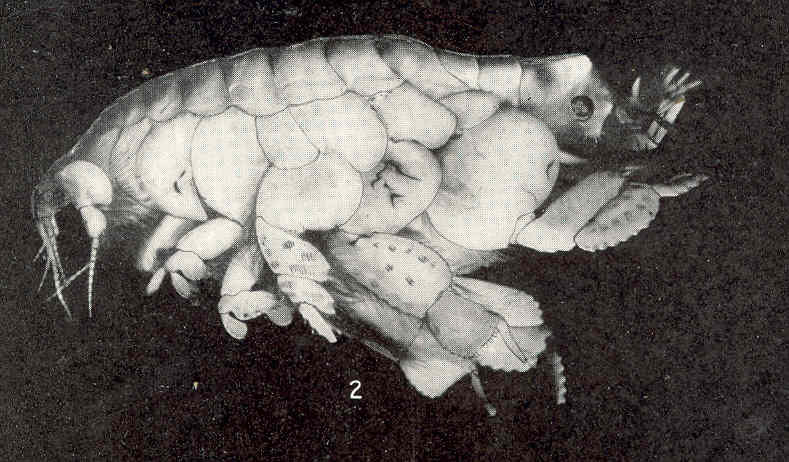

Scientific classification
- Domain: Eukaryota
- Kingdom: Animalia
- Phylum: Arthropoda
- Class: Malacostraca
- Order: Amphipoda
- Family: Haustoriidae
- Genus: Haustorius; Müller, 1775

Synonyms
- Bellia Bate, 1851

= Haustorius =

Genus of crustaceans

Haustorius is a genus of amphipods in the family Haustoriidae. There are about six described species in Haustorius.

== Species ==
These six species belong to the genus Haustorius:

- Haustorius algeriensis Mulot, 1968
- Haustorius arenarius (Slabber, 1769)
- Haustorius canadensis Bousfield, 1962
- Haustorius jayneae Foster & LeCroy, 1991
- Haustorius mexicanus Ortiz, Cházaro-Olvera & Winfield, 2001
- Haustorius orientalis Bellan-Santini, 2005
