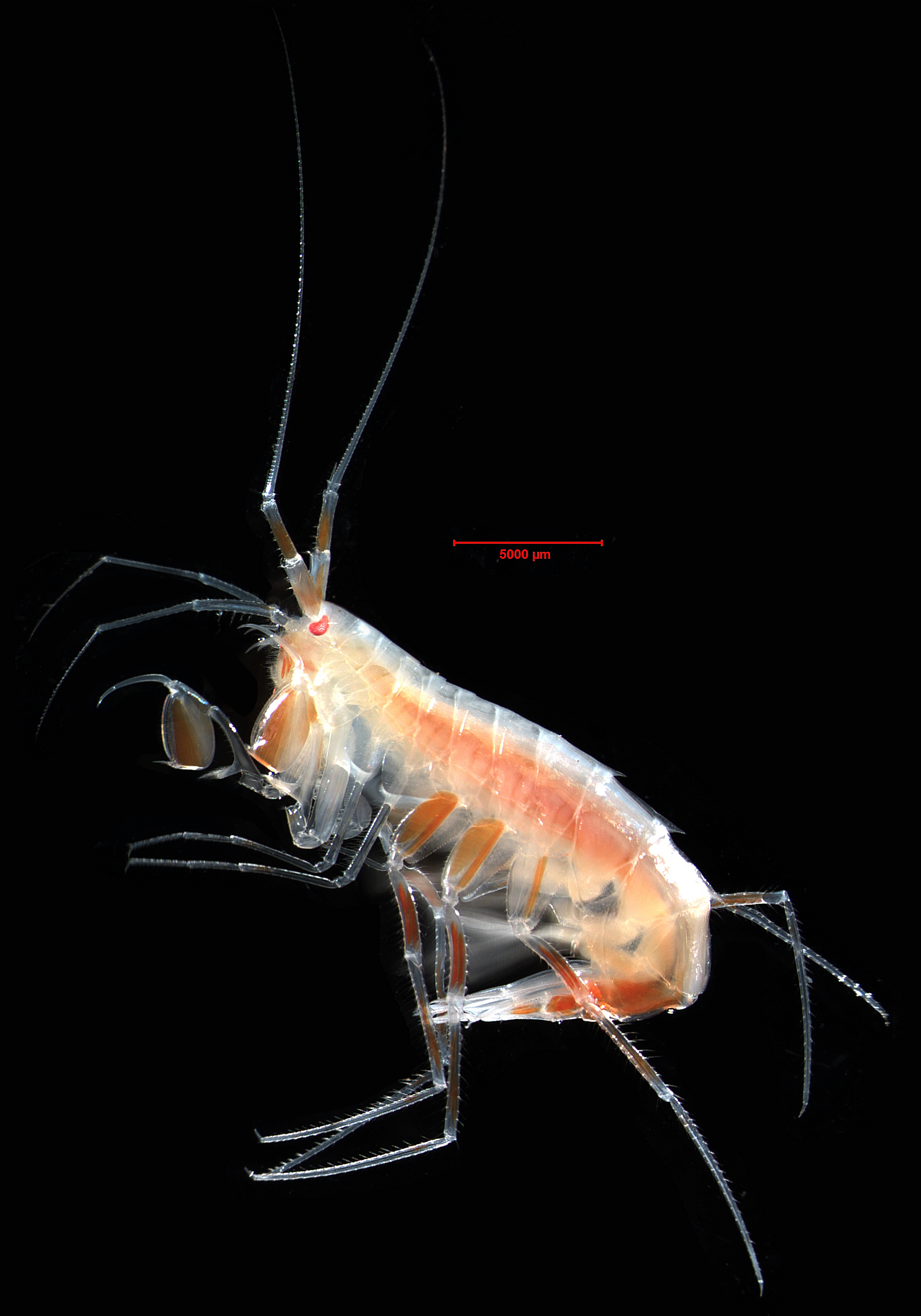
- Eusirus holmi

Scientific classification
- Kingdom: Animalia
- Phylum: Arthropoda
- Clade: Pancrustacea
- Class: Malacostraca
- Order: Amphipoda
- Superfamily: Eusiroidea
- Family: Eusiridae; Stebbing, 1888

Genera
- See text.

= Eusiridae =

Family of crustaceans

Eusiridae is a family of amphipods. It contains the following genera:

- Cleonardo Stebbing, 1888
- Dorotea Corbari, Frutos & Sorbe, 2019
- Dulcibella Weston & González, 2024
- Eusirella Chevreux, 1908
- Eusirogenes Stebbing, 1904
- Eusiropsis Stebbing, 1897
- Eusirus Krøyer, 1845
- Harcledo J. L. Barnard, 1964
- Metarhachotropis Ariyama & Kohtsuka, 2022
- Meteusiroides Pirlot, 1934
- Pareusirogenes Birstein & M. Vinogradov, 1955
- Pseudorhachotropis Ortiz, Winfield & Chazaro-Olvera, 2024
- Rhachotropis S. I. Smith, 1883
- Sennaia Bellan-Santini, 1997
- Triquetramana Hendrycks & Conlan, 2003
