= Thaumastocera =

Scientific classification
- Kingdom: Animalia
- Phylum: Arthropoda
- Class: Insecta
- Order: Diptera
- Family: Tabanidae
- Subfamily: Chrysopsinae
- Tribe: Rhinomyzini
- Genus: Thaumastocera; Grunberg, 1906

Type species
- Thaumastocera akwa Grunberg, 1906

Genus of insects

Thaumastocera is a genus of horse flies in the family Tabanidae.

== Species ==
- Thaumastocera akwa Grünberg, 1906
- Thaumastocera cervaria Séguy, 1935
