= Orgizocella =

Scientific classification
- Kingdom: Animalia
- Phylum: Arthropoda
- Class: Insecta
- Order: Diptera
- Family: Tabanidae
- Subfamily: Chrysopsinae
- Tribe: Rhinomyzini
- Genus: Orgizocella; Quentin, 1990

Type species
- Tabanocella seyrigi Séguy, 1951

Genus of insects

Orgizocella is a genus of horse flies in the family Tabanidae.

== Distribution ==
Madagascar.

== Species ==
- Orgizocella pauliana Quentin, 1990
- Orgizocella seyrigi (Séguy, 1951)
