= Mary Anne Stebbing =

English botanist, botanical illustrator

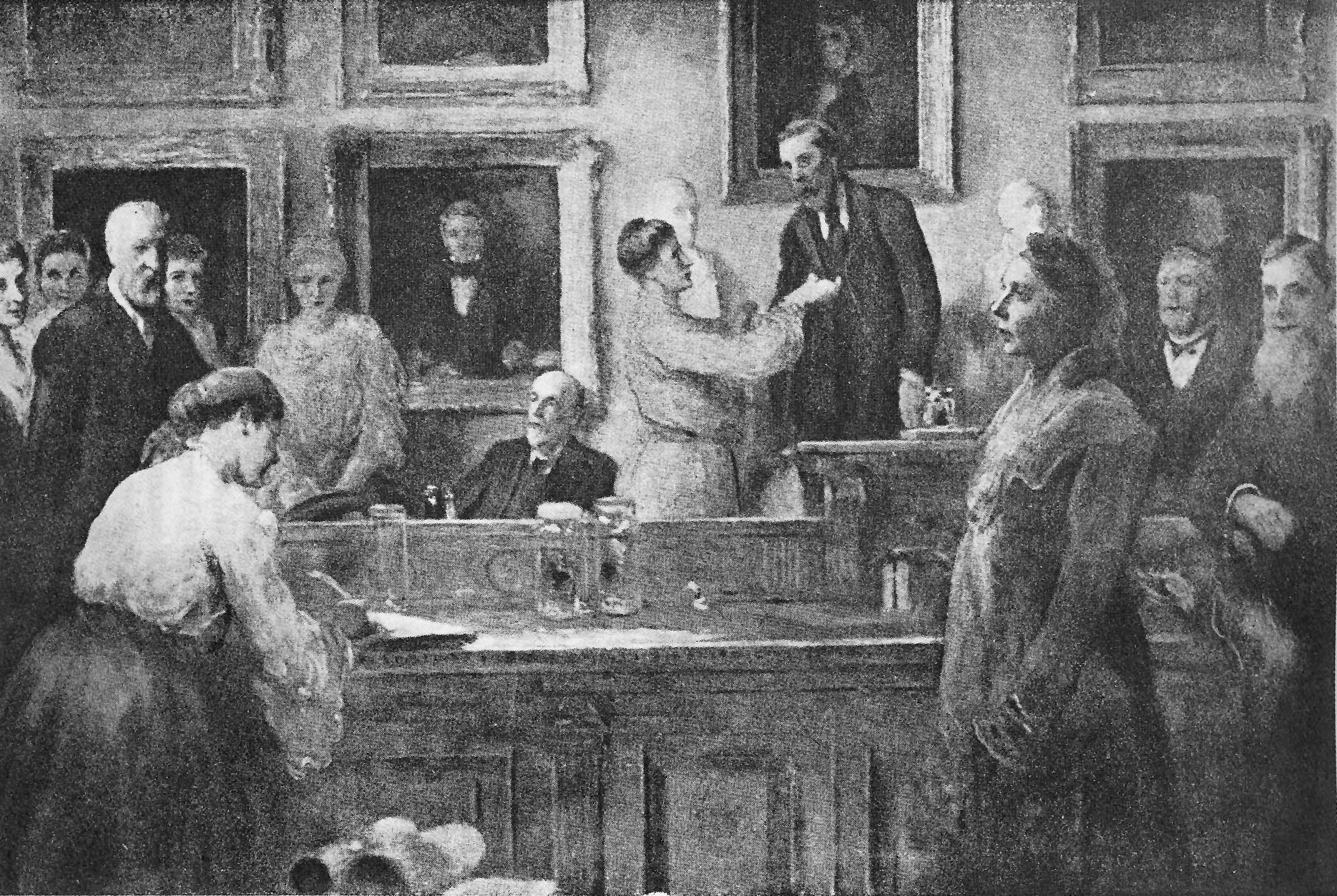
The first admission of women as fellows of the Linnean Society in 1905, Mary Anne Stebbing is depicted in the right foreground, - from the original version of a painting by James Sant (1820–1916)

Mary Anne Stebbing FLS (née Saunders; 11 September 1845 – 21 January 1927) was a botanist and botanical illustrator. She was among the first women to be admitted to the Linnean Society.

== Personal life ==
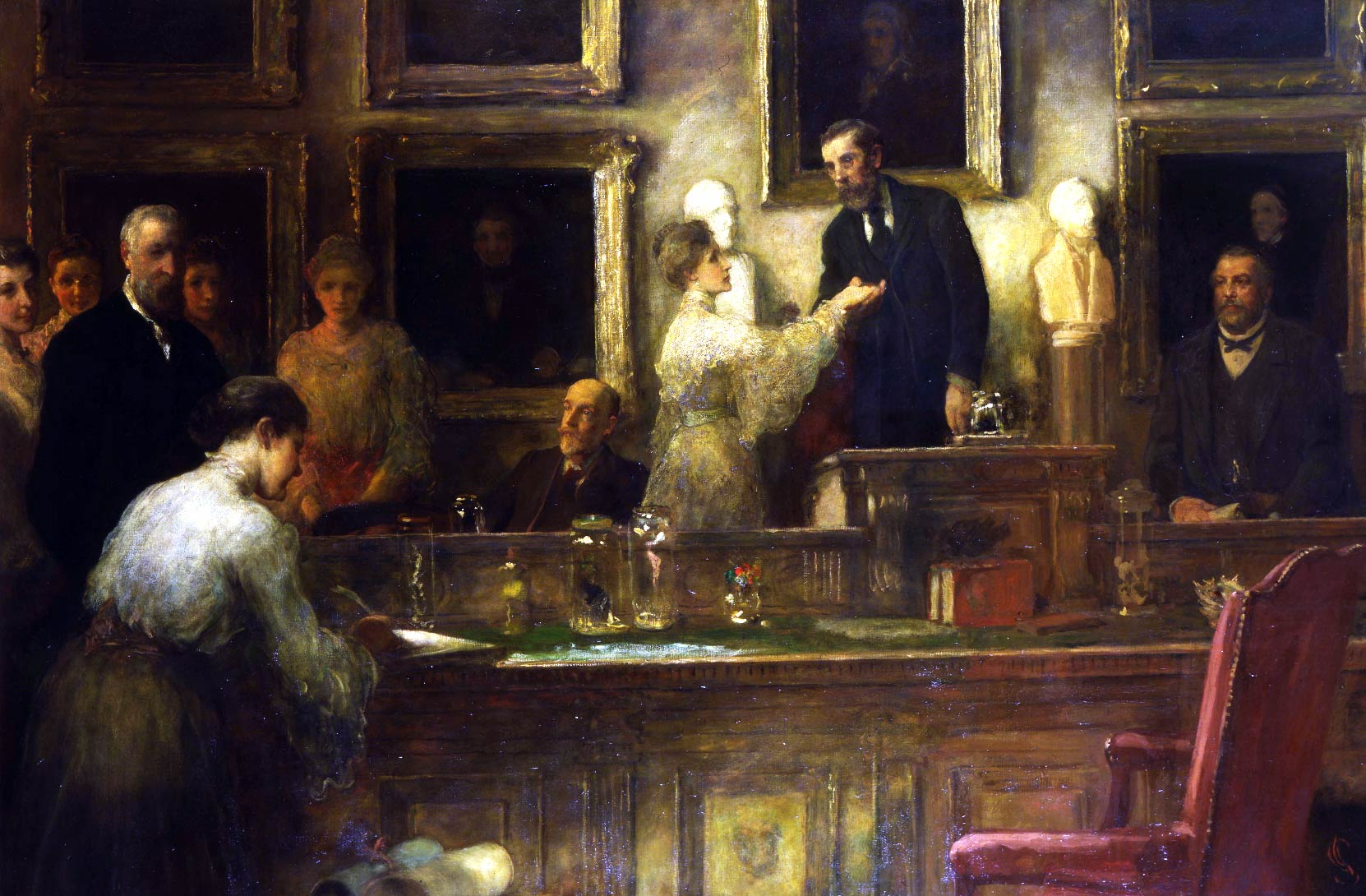
The final version of the painting in which Stebbing has been painted out

Stebbing was the daughter of botanist and entomologist William Wilson Saunders. Growing up she was involved in gathering, identifying and sketching botanicals for her father, as well as caring for the garden. Her husband, zoologist Thomas Roscoe Rede Stebbing described her family as a “very nest of naturalists” in his autobiography. She met her husband through the Holmesdale Natural History Club which had been set up by her father. They married in 1867 and as a wedding gift Mary presented him with a volume of orchids she had drawn herself with the note “to my dear husband”. Following their marriage they moved to Torquay, Cornwall, before moving to Tunbridge Wells in 1877. On their golden anniversary they spent a portion of the day drawing together. T.R.R. Stebbing died in July 1926, and Mary Anne died on 21 January 1927 in Tunbridge Wells. She was buried in Rusthall.

== Work ==
Stebbing sought to illustrate British flora in water colour. Her early work has been described as focusing on aesthetics, more closely resembling a flower painter than a botanical illustrator. Much of this early work was destroyed in a house fire in 1881. Her style changed in her later work, her sketches became more detailed including multiple sections of the plants and notes, for example on the location the specimen was found. She has been described as a “serious and skilled botanical illustrator”, praised for recording her subjects faithfully to include “abnormality and infection” instead of idealising them. A collection of 14 of her illustrations are held at the Royal Botanic Gardens, Kew.

In addition to her own work, Stebbing in credited with assisting in her husband's work. She helped him to classify species and assisted with sketches for his books on Crustacea. Despite this, her husband published all his works under his name only and Stebbing never published any research under her own name.

== Admittance to the Linnaean Society ==
On 19 January 1904 Stebbing, alongside 10 others, was one of the first women to be admitted to the Linnaean society. Lord Crisp, the husband of one of the other female Fellow being admitted, Lady Crisp, commissioned a painting of the event. In the original painting Stebbing was a central figure, however Lord Crisp objected to this, initially stating “Naturally if I pay £300 for a picture, I should prefer that another Fellow’s wife should not be the selected figure!”, and later implying Stebbing lacked scientific merit; “we must surely have at the table a lady Fellow who has done something, not one without a record.”. Several newspapers commented on the picture, for example The World commented “the picture was rendered somewhat comic by the figure [Stebbing] in blue plush in the foreground”. When the picture was eventually presented to the Linnaean society in 1919, Stebbing had been painted over and replaced with an empty chair.

Although there is no official record of attendance, Stebbing is thought to have regularly attended meetings of the society.

== See also ==
- Timeline of women in science
