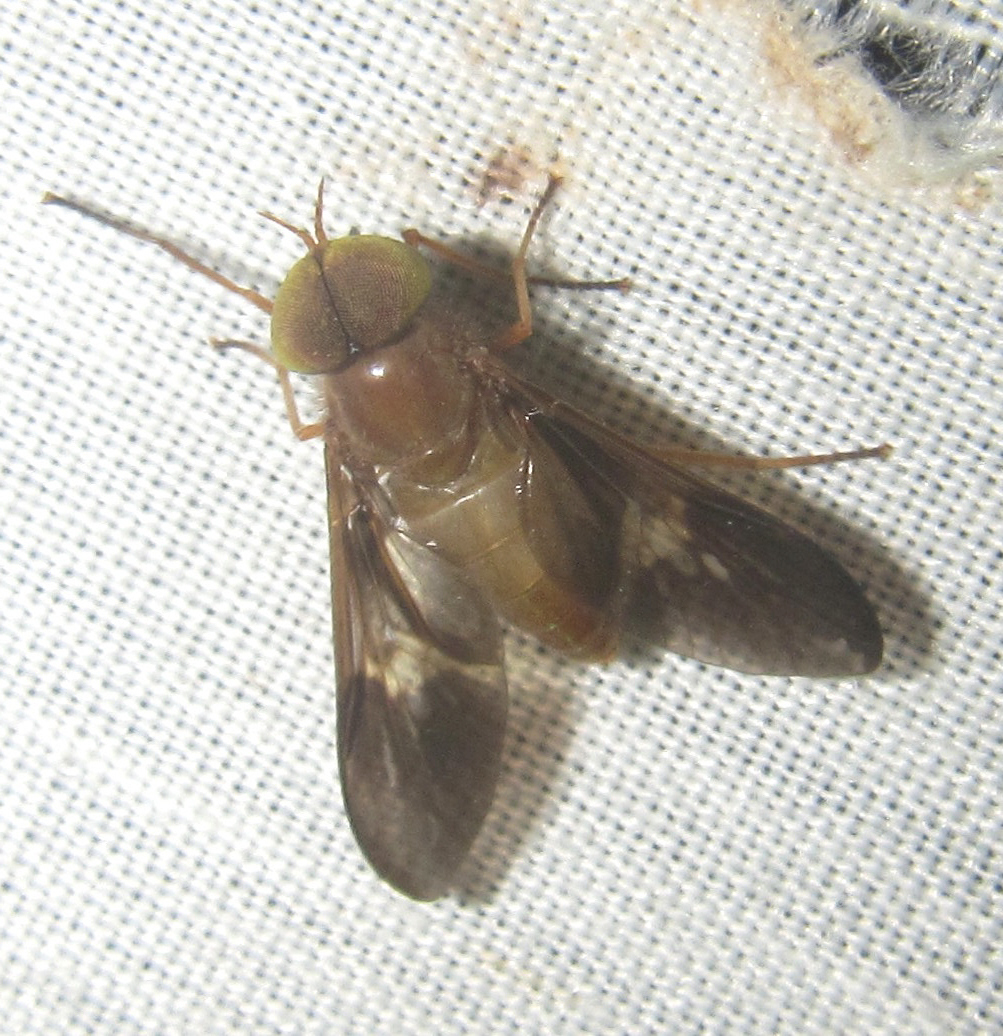
- Oldroydiella fallax

Scientific classification
- Kingdom: Animalia
- Phylum: Arthropoda
- Class: Insecta
- Order: Diptera
- Family: Tabanidae
- Subfamily: Chrysopsinae
- Tribe: Rhinomyzini
- Genus: Oldroydiella; Dias, 1955

Type species
- Tabanus fallax Macquart, 1846

= Oldroydiella =

Genus of insects

Oldroydiella is a genus of horse flies in the family Tabanidae.

== Species ==
- Oldroydiella albocincta Zeegers, 2017
- Oldroydiella expatriata (Oldroyd, 1957)
- Oldroydiella fallax (Macquart, 1846)
- Oldroydiella oldroydi (Paulian, 1962)
- Oldroydiella splendida (Oldroyd, 1963)
- Oldroydiella tenebrosa Dias, 1959
