= Mackerrasia =

Scientific classification
- Kingdom: Animalia
- Phylum: Arthropoda
- Class: Insecta
- Order: Diptera
- Family: Tabanidae
- Subfamily: Chrysopsinae
- Tribe: Rhinomyzini
- Genus: Mackerrasia; Dias, 1956

Type species
- Rhinomyza simplicicornis Austen, 1912

Genus of insects

Mackerrasia is a genus of horse flies in the family Tabanidae.

== Species ==
- Mackerrasia aurea (Oldroyd, 1957)
- Mackerrasia simplicicornis (Austen, 1912)
