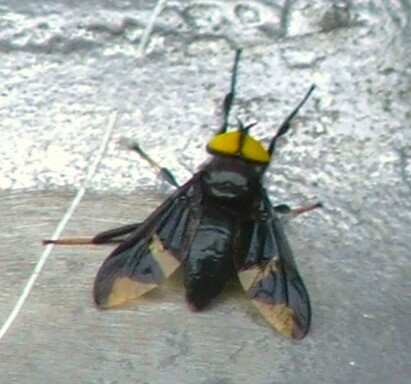
- Thriambeutes v-albus

Scientific classification
- Kingdom: Animalia
- Phylum: Arthropoda
- Class: Insecta
- Order: Diptera
- Family: Tabanidae
- Subfamily: Chrysopsinae
- Tribe: Rhinomyzini
- Genus: Thriambeutes; Grünberg, 1906

Type species
- Thriambeutes singularis Grünberg, 1906

= Thriambeutes =

Genus of insects

Thriambeutes is a genus of horse flies in the family Tabanidae.

== Species ==
- Thriambeutes melanochrysa Zeegers, 2017
- Thriambeutes mesembrinoides (Surcouf, 1908)
- Thriambeutes nigripennis (Enderlein, 1922)
- Thriambeutes singularis Grünberg, 1906
- Thriambeutes v-album (Surcouf, 1908)
