= Idunella =

Scientific classification
- Kingdom: Animalia
- Phylum: Arthropoda
- Clade: Pancrustacea
- Class: Malacostraca
- Order: Amphipoda
- Family: Liljeborgiidae
- Genus: Idunella; Sars, 1894

Type species
- Idunella aequicornis Sars, 1877

Synonyms
- Listriella J.L. Barnard, 1959 Ronconoides Ledoyer, 1973

Genus of crustaceans

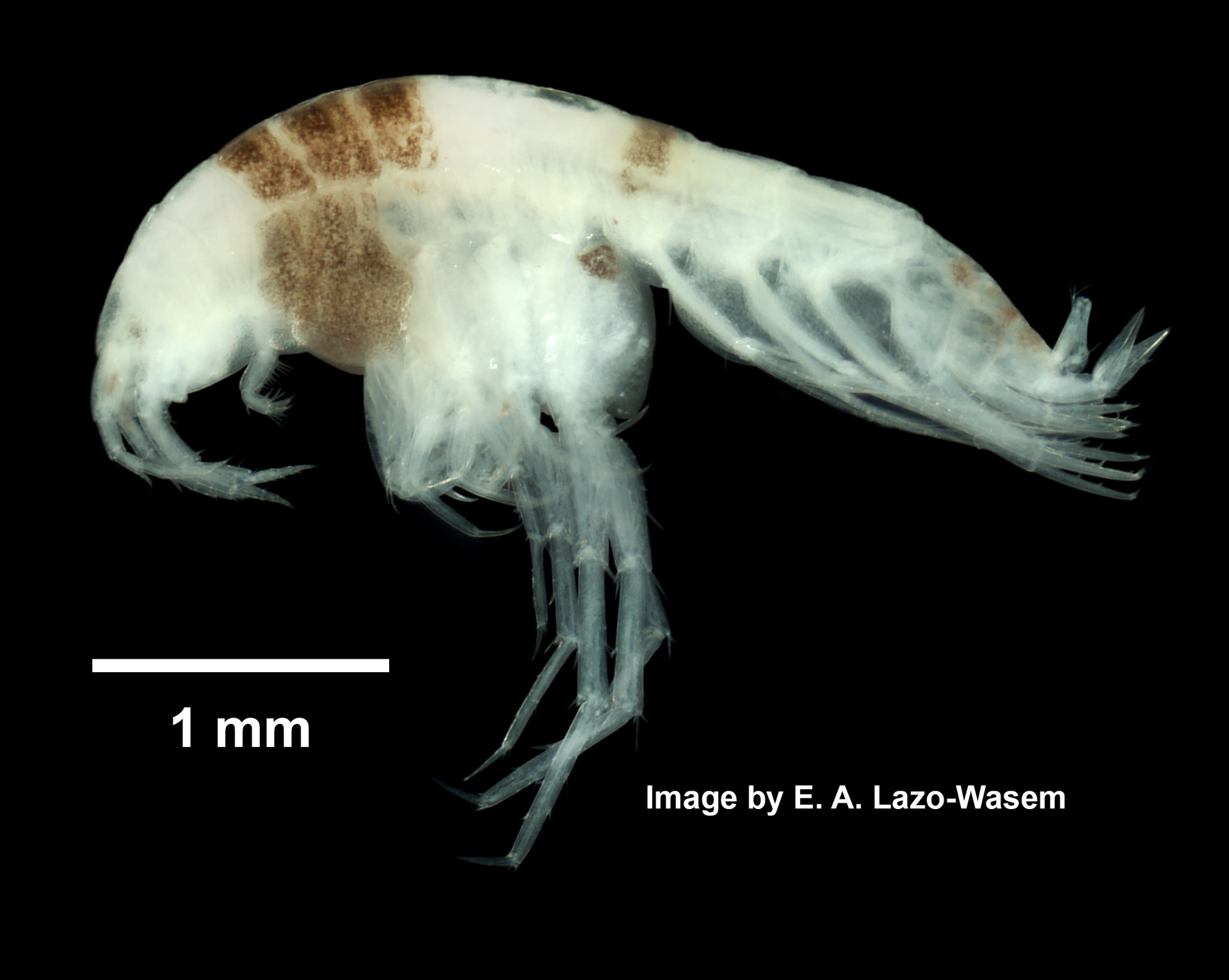

Idunella is a genus of crustaceans in family Liljeborgiidae. It contains 48 species:

- Idunella aequicornis (G.O. Sars, 1877)
- Idunella albina (J.L. Barnard, 1959)
- Idunella andresi (Martin, Ortiz & Atienza, 2000)
- Idunella bacheleti Gouillieux, Bonifacio & Lavesque, 2020
- Idunella bahia (McKinney, 1979)
- Idunella barnardi (Wigley, 1966)
- Idunella bowenae G. Karaman, 1979
- Idunella brevicornis (Ledoyer, 1973)
- Idunella carinata (McKinney, 1979)
- Idunella chilkensis Chilton, 1921
- Idunella clymenellae (Mills, 1962)
- Idunella curvidactyla Nagata, 1965
- Idunella dahli Schellenberg, 1938
- Idunella demersalis (Sivaprakasam, 1972)
- Idunella dentipalma (Duavin & Gentil, 1983)
- Idunella diffusa (J.L. Barnard, 1959)
- Idunella eriopisa (J.L. Barnard, 1959)
- Idunella excavata (Schiecke, 1973)
- Idunella goleta (J.L. Barnard, 1959)
- Idunella janisae Imbach, 1967
- Idunella kensleyi (Ortiz & Lalana, 1996)
- Idunella lindae (Griffiths, 1974)
- Idunella longipalma (Othman & Morino, 2006)
- Idunella longipalmata (Ren, 2012)
- Idunella melanica (J.L. Barnard, 1959)
- Idunella mollis (Myers & McGrath, 1983)
- Idunella nagatai G. Karaman, 1979
- Idunella nana (Schiecke, 1973)
- Idunella orientalis (Hirayama, 1985)
- Idunella pauli Imbach, 1967
- Idunella pirata Krapp-Schickel, 1975
- Idunella quintana (McKinney, 1979)
- Idunella robustoflagellata (Ren, 2012)
- Idunella saldanha (Griffiths, 1975).
- Idunella serra Imbach, 1967
- Idunella similis (Rabindranath, 1971)
- Idunella sinuosa (Griffiths, 1974)
- Idunella sketi Karaman, 1980
- Idunella smithi Lazo-Wasem, 1985
- Idunella spinifera (Dauvin & Gentil, 1983)
- Idunella titinga (Wakabara, Tamaram, Valério-Berardi & Leite, 1988)
- Idunella tuberculata (Dang & Le, 2012)
- Idunella verrilli Yabut & Sawicki, 2015
