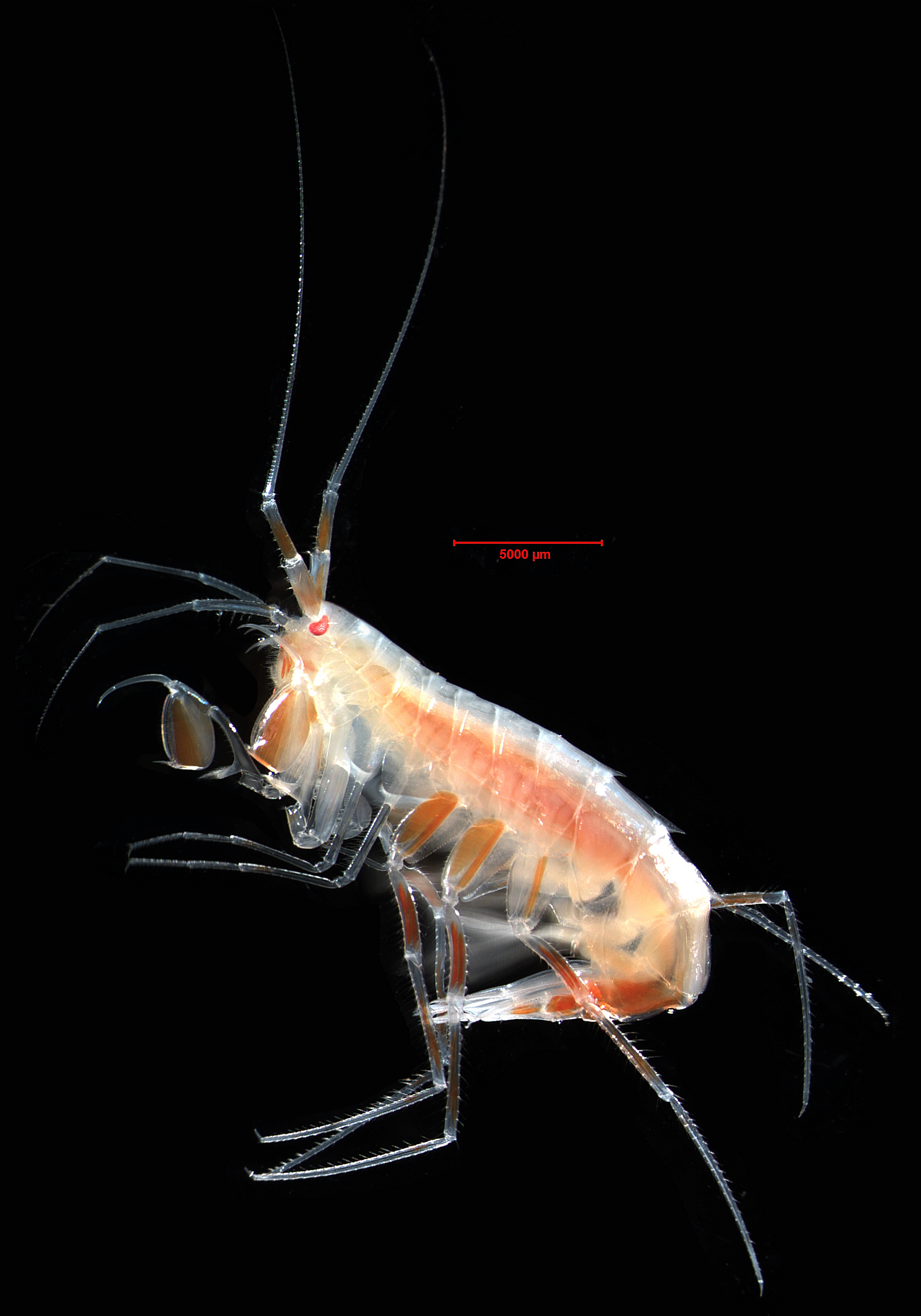

Scientific classification
- Domain: Eukaryota
- Kingdom: Animalia
- Phylum: Arthropoda
- Class: Malacostraca
- Order: Amphipoda
- Family: Eusiridae
- Genus: Eusirus
- Species: E. holmi

Binomial name
- Eusirus holmi Hansen, 1887

= Eusirus holmi =

Species of crustacean

Eusirus holmi is a species of predatory marine amphipod within the family Eusiridae.

== Description ==
Eusirus holmi is a large marine amphipod, reaching a maximum length of 4 cm. Its body is mainly white in colour, however individuals also host reddish-brown and orange highlights. The eyes are intermediate in size and red in colour. The species possess antennae, which are as long as its body. Individuals also possess well developed grasping claws on their first two pairs of legs. The species is predatory, using these grasping claws to capture and hold on to prey. After breeding E. holmi lays several hundred eggs into a brood pouch, with eggs hatching during the warmer summer months.

== Distribution and habitat ==
Eusirus holmi is native throughout the marine waters of the Arctic, where it can be found inhabiting the water column, seafloor and surfaces of underwater sea ice. The species is generally found within the waters of deep oceanic basins, where E. holmi preys on a wide variety of marine invertebrates.
