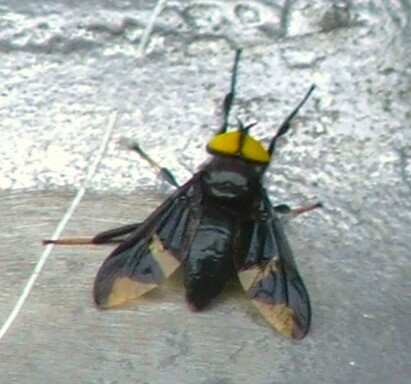
- Thriambeutes v-albus

Scientific classification
- Kingdom: Animalia
- Phylum: Arthropoda
- Class: Insecta
- Order: Diptera
- Family: Tabanidae
- Subfamily: Chrysopsinae
- Tribe: Rhinomyzini; Enderlein, 1922

= Rhinomyzini =

Tribe of insects

Rhinomyzini is a tribe of horse flies in the family Tabanidae.

== Genera ==
- Alocella Quentin, 1990
- Betrequia Oldroyd, 1970
- Gastroxides Saunders, 1842
- Jashinea Oldroyd, 1970
- Mackerrasia Dias, 1956
- Oldroydiella Dias, 1955
- Orgizocella Quentin, 1990
- Orgizomyia Grünberg, 1906
- Rhinomyza Wiedemann, 1820
- Seguytabanus Paulian, 1962
- Sphecodemyia Austen, 1937
- Tabanocella Bigot, 1856
- Thaumastocera Grünberg, 1906
- Thriambeutes Grünberg, 1906
