= Thomas Roscoe Rede Stebbing =

British zoologist

Thomas Roscoe Rede Stebbing had "a slight physique" and "a certain whimsical humour".

The Reverend Thomas Roscoe Rede Stebbing FRS FLS (6 February 1835, London – 8 July 1926, Royal Tunbridge Wells) was a British zoologist, who described himself as "a serf to natural history, principally employed about Crustacea". Educated in London and Oxford, he only took to natural history in his thirties, having worked as a teacher until then. Although an ordained Anglican priest, Stebbing promoted Darwinism in a number of popular works, and was banned from preaching as a result. His scientific works mostly concerned crustaceans, especially the Amphipoda and Isopoda, the most notable being his work on the amphipods of the Challenger expedition.

His zoological author abbreviation is Stebbing.

== Biography ==
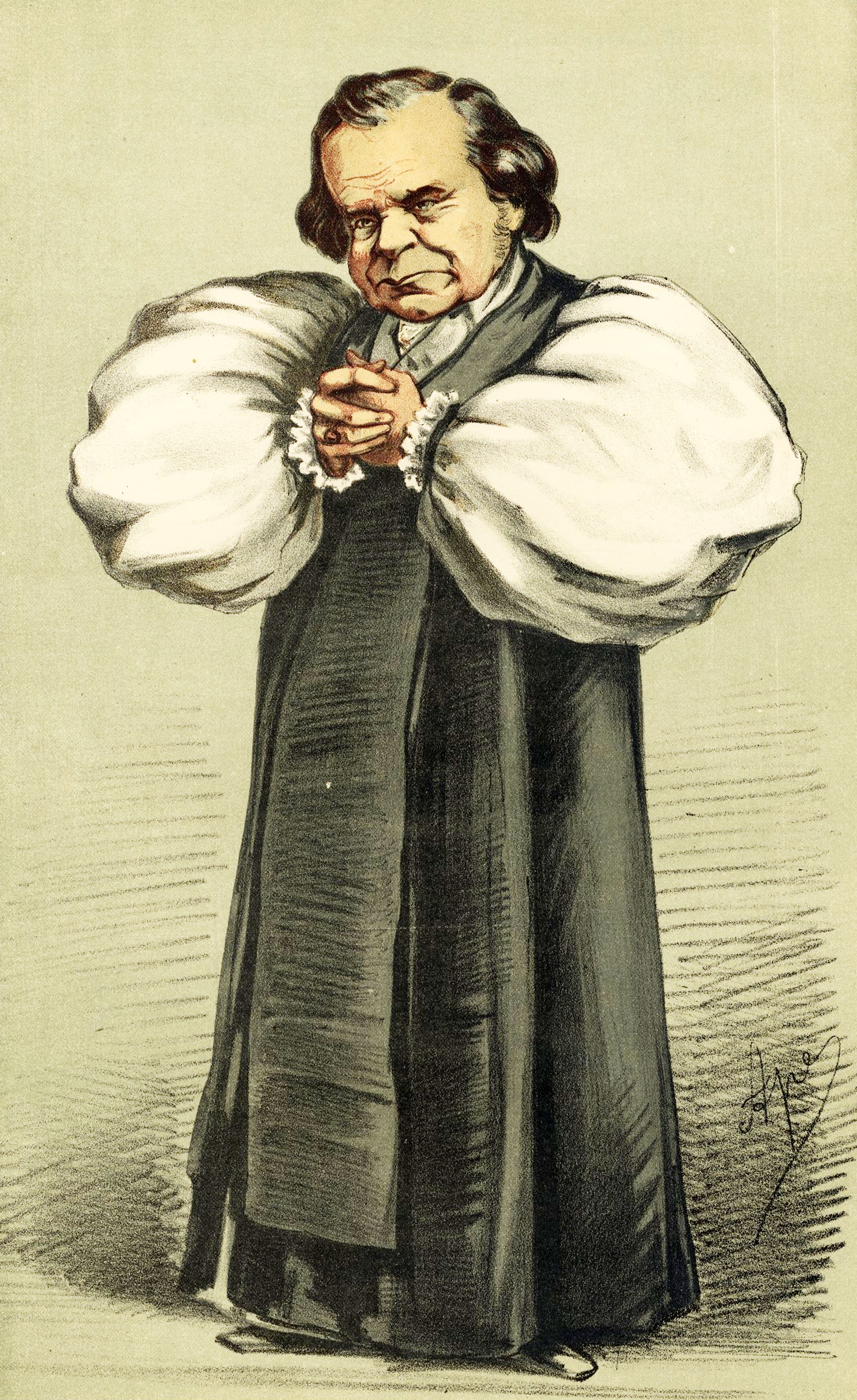
Caricature of Samuel Wilberforce, known as "Soapy Sam", from an 1869 issue of Vanity Fair: Wilberforce ordained Stebbing in 1859, but became a staunch opponent of Darwinism, while Stebbing became a fervent supporter.

Thomas Roscoe Rede Stebbing was born on 6 February 1835 in Euston Square, London, the seventh of thirteen or fourteen children, to a clergyman and the editor of the Athenaeum, Henry Stebbing, and his wife, Mary Griffin. Thomas was educated at the King's College School, and afterwards entered King's College, London to study classics, graduating with a BA in 1855. He then matriculated at Lincoln College, Oxford, before studied at Worcester College, Oxford, gaining a BA in law and modern history there in 1857 and an MA in 1859. Around this time, he was a master at Radley College and Wellington College. He took on various roles at Worcester College, including that of fellow (1860–1868), tutor (1865–1867), vice-provost (1865) and eventually dean (1866), as well as a lecturer in divinity. He resigned his fellowship in 1868. He was ordained into the Church of England by Samuel Wilberforce, Bishop of Oxford in 1859.

By 1863, Stebbing had begun to work as a tutor in Reigate, Surrey, where he met the entomologist William Wilson Saunders, whose daughter Mary Anne was a capable botanist and illustrator. Stebbing took up the study of natural history around this time, and married Mary Anne in 1867. The couple moved to Torquay, Devon after their marriage, where Stebbing continued to work as a tutor and schoolmaster, and began to write about theology, Darwinism and natural history, partly under the influence of the naturalist William Pengelly.

In 1873, Stebbing produced his first paper on crustaceans, and began to study the Amphipoda the following year. In 1877, Stebbing moved to Royal Tunbridge Wells, where he lived in Ephraim Lodge, on the edge of Tunbridge Wells Common, to benefit from the greater number of students in London, and to be closer to the libraries, museums and scientific circles in the capital. As his finances improved, he was able to give up teaching altogether and concentrate on writing. He died in Ephraim Lodge on 8 July 1926. His funeral was held at St. Paul's Church, Rusthall, where Stebbing had officiated when requested; since its churchyard was inadequate, Stebbing's body was buried in the town's public cemetery. His wife survived him by only a few months.

== Evolution and religion ==
Having trained as an evangelical Anglican, Stebbing expected to be a staunch opponent of Charles Darwin's recently published theory of evolution by natural selection. Stebbing reported that "on reading The Origin of Species, as a preliminary, it has to be confessed that, instead of confuting, I became his ardent disciple", and so he adopted the position of a religious rationalist. Following a critical review of The Descent of Man in The Times in 1871, Stebbing gained prominence by responding in Nature.

Stebbing wrote a number of essays on the topic of Darwinism, in which he dissected the argument posited against it, and questioned various aspects of Christianity, including the literal truth of the Book of Genesis, the doctrine of the Trinity, the divinity of Jesus, many of the Thirty-Nine Articles, miracles and prophecy. They included Essays on Darwinism (1871), Faith in Fetters (1919) and Plain Speaking (1926). His outspoken stance resulted in his being banned from preaching, and he was never offered a parish by the church.

== Crustacea ==
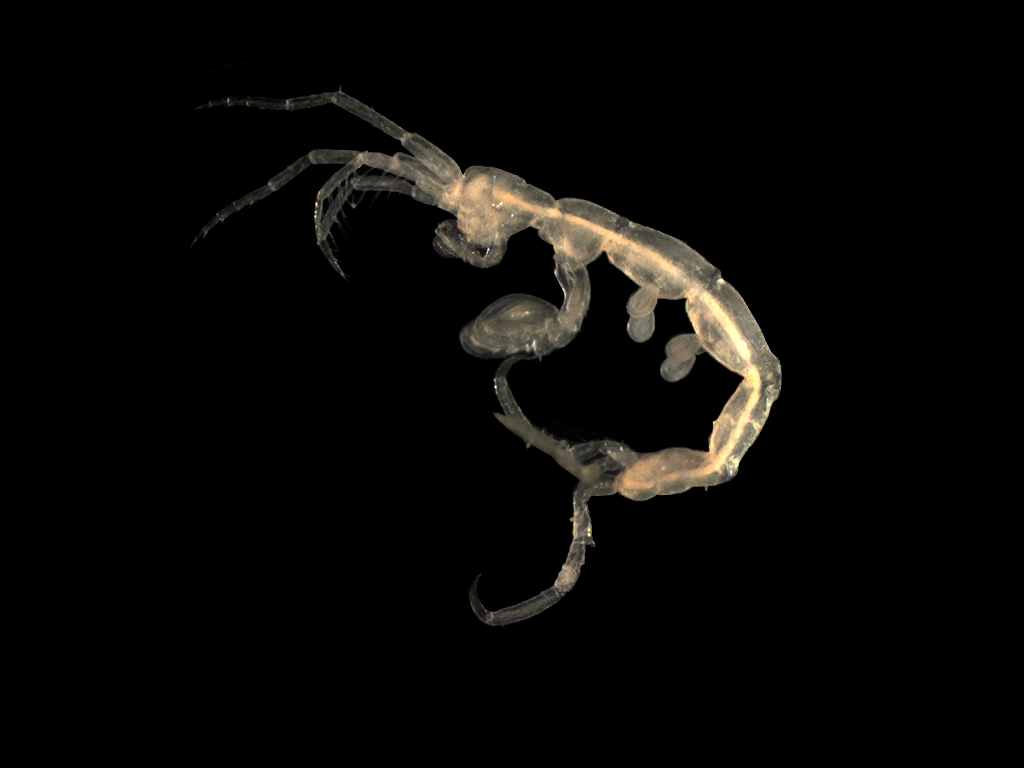
Pariambus typicus a species in the genus Pariambus, which Stebbing erected in 1888

Most of Stebbing's scientific works, comprising more than 110 papers, covered amphipod crustaceans. Rev. A. M. Norman, a member of the Challenger Committee, recommended that Stebbing produce a monograph on the amphipods collected on the 1872–1876 expedition by HMS Challenger, which he did, reproducing the original description for every genus, and providing an extensive bibliography of the group.

He also produced a monograph of the Cumacea, a natural history of the Crustacea, and a biography of the Scottish naturalist and founder of the University Marine Biological Station, Millport, David Robertson. In 1906, Stebbing published the volume on Gammaridea for the series Das Tierreich.

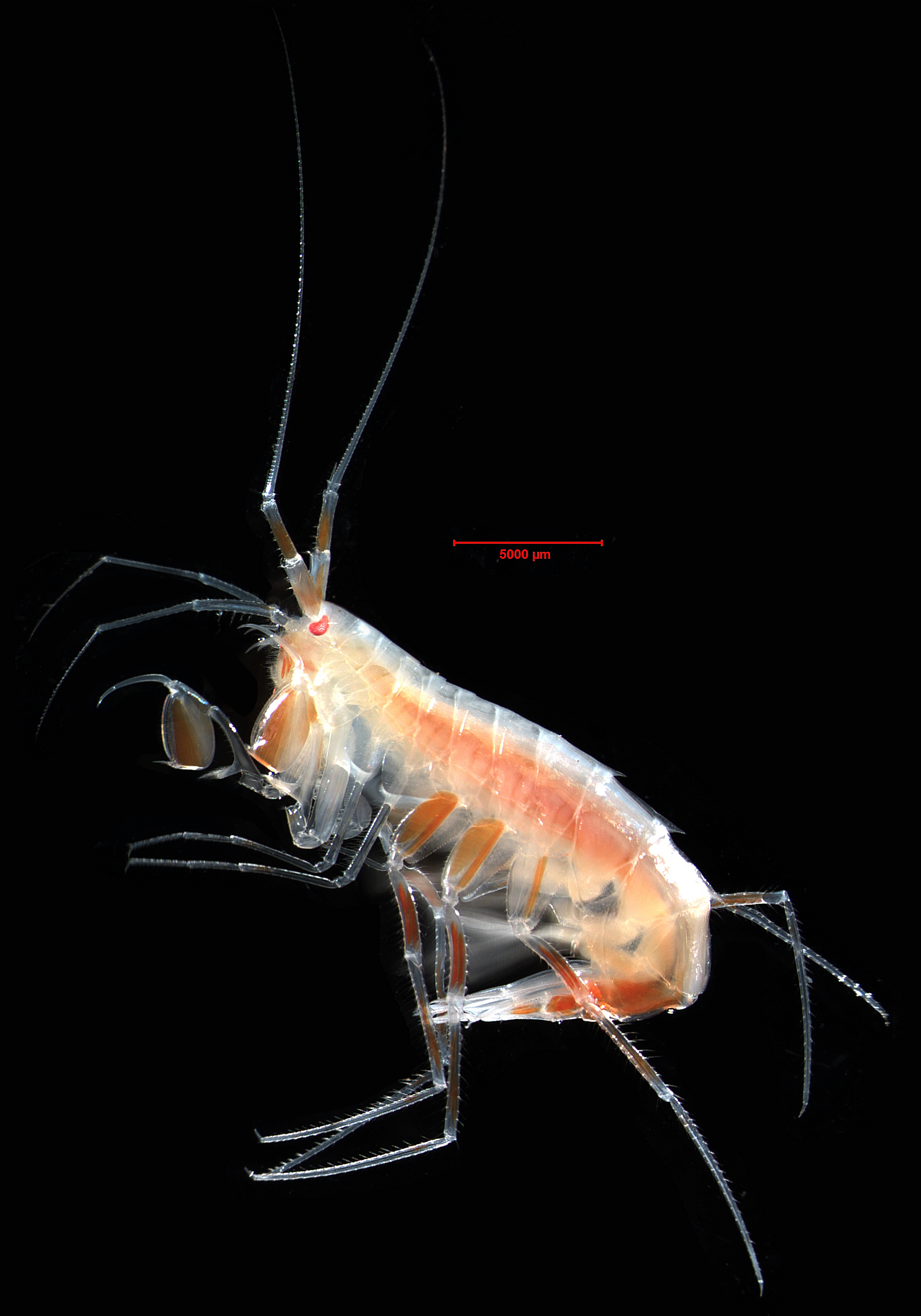
Stebbing erected the family Eusiridae in 1888 for amphipods such as Eusirus holmii.

== Legacy ==
Stebbing was made a Fellow of the Linnean Society on 5 December 1895, a Fellow of the Royal Society on 4 June 1896, and was awarded the Gold Medal of the Linnean Society in 1908. He had strenuously advocated the admittance of women to the Linnean Society, and obtained a supplementary charter to allow it; his wife was among the first women to be admitted.

A number of animal species have been named in honour of Stebbing:

- Hyale stebbingi Chevreux, 1888 (Amphipoda: Hyalidae)
- Parapodascon stebbingi (Giard & Bonnier, 1895) (Isopoda: Podasconidae)
- Argissa stebbingi Bonnier, 1896, a synonym of Argissa hamatipes (Norman, 1869) (Amphipoda: Argissidae)
- Phronima stebbingii Vosseler, 1901 (Amphipoda: Phronimidae)
- Metapenaeus stebbingi (Nobili, 1904) (Decapoda: Penaeidae)
- Protellopsis stebbingii Pearse, 1908 (Amphipoda: Caprellidae)
- Sphyrapus stebbingi Richardson, 1911 (Tanaidacea: Sphyrapidae)
- Macropisthopus stebbingi K. A. Barnard, 1916 (Amphipoda: Ampithoidae)
- Carpias stebbingi (Monod, 1933) (Isopoda: Janiridae)
- Pardaliscoides stebbingi Ledoyer, 1970 (Amphipoda: Pardaliscidae)

== Publications ==
- Stebbing, Thomas R. R. (1871). Essays on Darwinism. London: Longmans, Green and Co. OCLC 15051183 (all editions).
- —— (1871). "The "Times" Review of Darwin's "Descent of Man"". Nature. 3 (77): 488–489. Bibcode:1871Natur...3..488S. doi:10.1038/003488c0. S2CID 4142603.
- —— (1893). A History of Crustacea: Recent Malacostraca. London: Kegan Paul, Trench, Trübner & Co. OCLC 907584315 (all editions).
- —— (1900–1920). "On Some Crustaceans from the Falkland Islands collected by Mr. Rupert Vallentin". Proceedings of the Zoological Society of London. OCLC 670221777 (all editions). (published in three parts, 1900, 1914, 1920)
- —— (1913). Cumacea (Sympoda). Das Tierreich. Vol. 39. Berlin: R. Friedlander und Sohn. OCLC 1895484 (all editions). (in English)

== See also ==
- Taxa named by Thomas Roscoe Rede Stebbing
