= William Wilson Saunders =

British insurance broker, entomologist and botanist

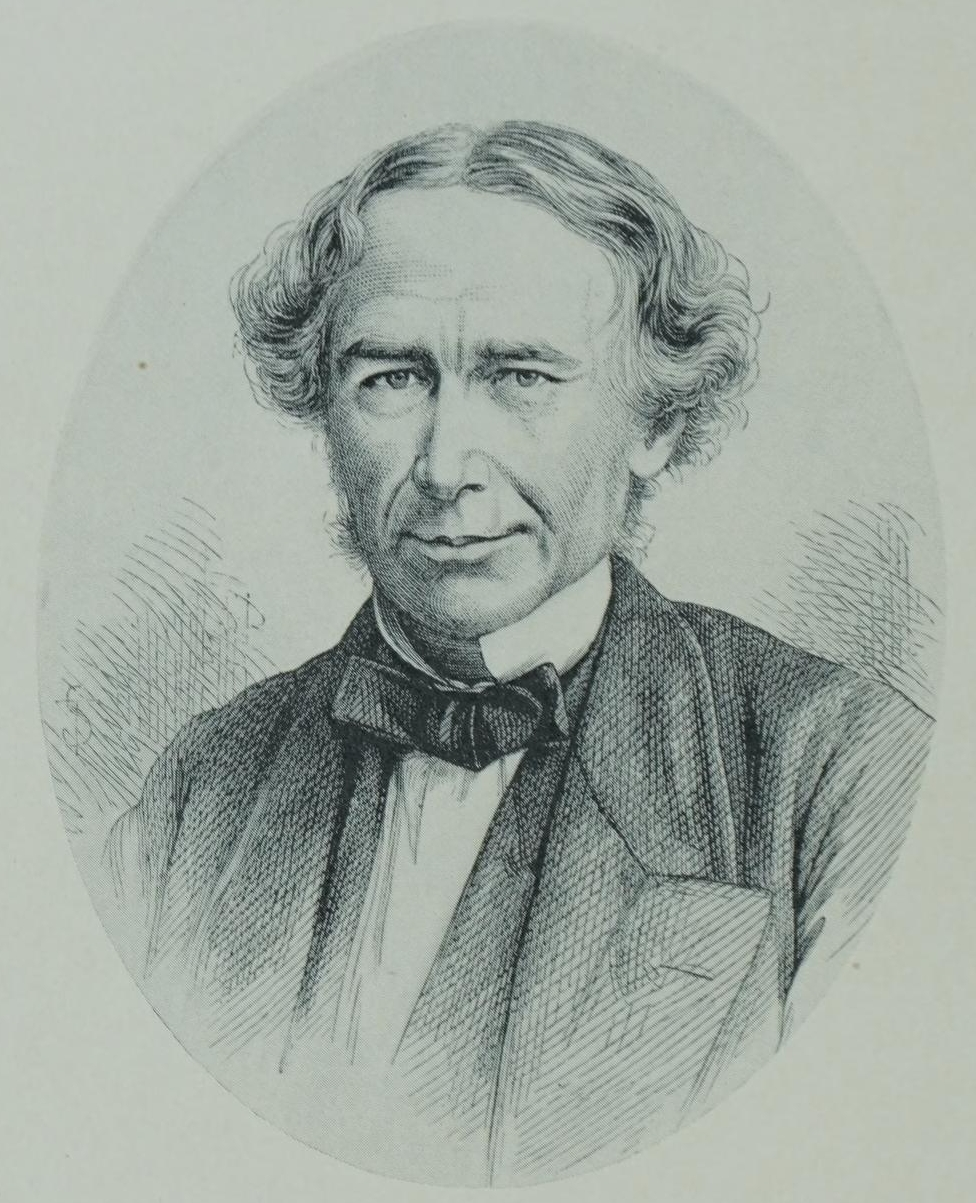

William Wilson Saunders FRS FLS (4 June 1809 – 13 September 1879) was a British insurance broker, entomologist and botanist. He served briefly as an engineer with the Honorable East India Company in India during which time he developed a keen interest in natural history. He took an interest in plants, fungi and insects. An orchid genus Saundersia was named in his honour but it is no longer in use.

== Life and work ==
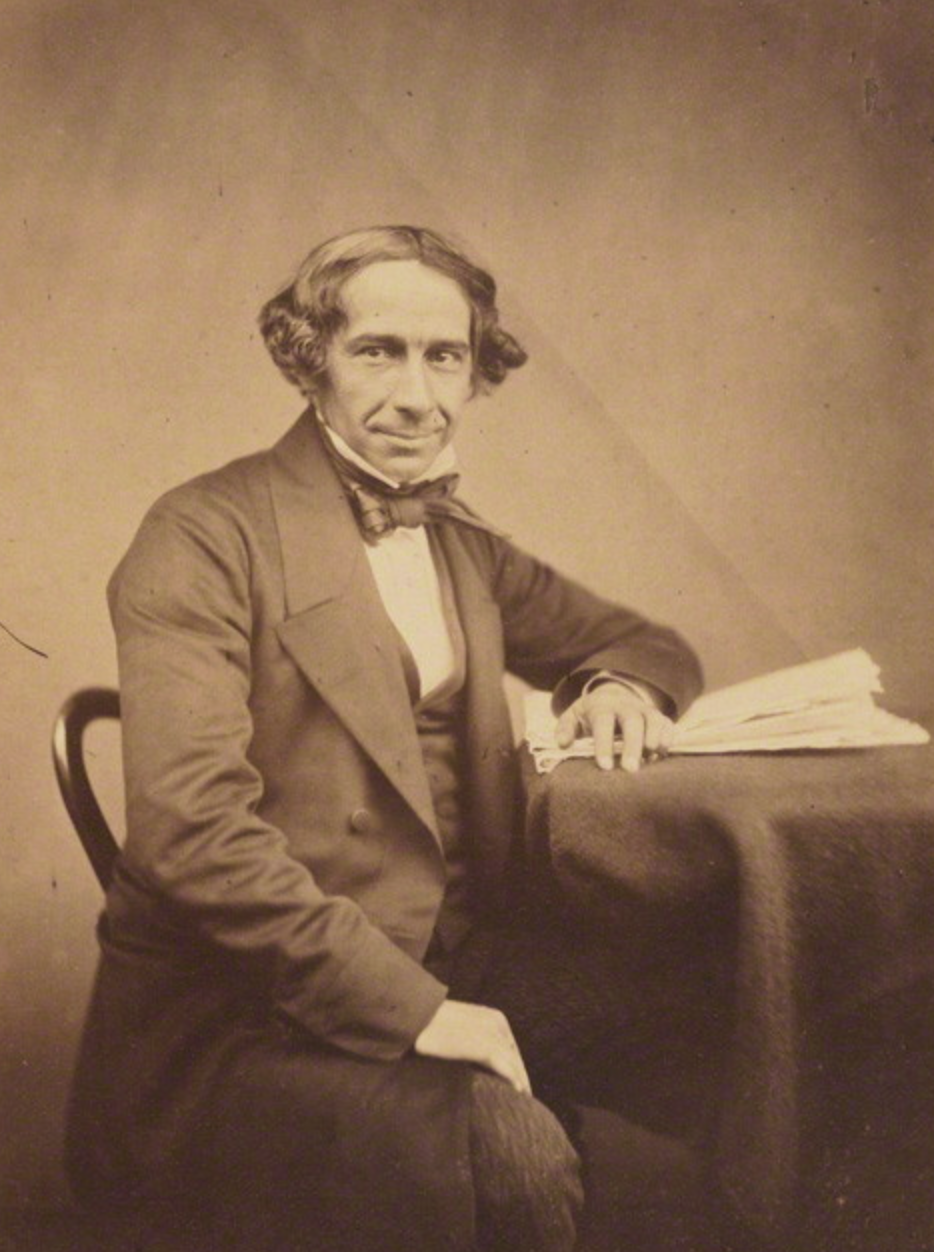
William Saunders

William Saunders was born near Wendover, Buckinghamshire, the son of Rev. James Saunders, Vicar of Kirtlington. He was tutored at home and at the East India Company Military Academy in Addiscombe. He received a position as an engineer in 1829 and went to India but resigned two years later. In India, he published his first scientific work on "Hydraulic Cements" in Gleanings in Science (1831). He also became keenly interested in natural history and collected plants and insects and brought them back to England. He lived in Wandsworth and joined the business of an uncle Joshua Saunders, later to be his father-in-law, serving as an underwriter at Lloyd's of London. He built up herbaria and insect collections. His collection of wood samples with information on density was exhibited at the Great Exhibition of 1851. He served as president of the Entomological Society from 1841 to 1842 and again from 1856 to 1857, was treasurer of the Linnean Society of London from 1861 to 1873 and was a Fellow of the Royal Society from 1853.

Saunders added, in later life, his middle name Wilson to distinguish himself from others, taking it from his friend William Wilson, father of George Fergusson Wilson, the chemist. He married his cousin Catharine Saunders in 1832 and they lived at East Hill, Wandsworth, Surrey. After her death, he married Mary Anne, daughter of Abraham Mello, in 1841.

Saunders lived at Reigate from 1857 and was also a well known horticulturalist and collected succulents and orchids. It was here that he published Refugium Botanicum in 1868. He founded the Holmesdale Natural History Club. His entomological interests centred on Lepidoptera and Hymenoptera but his collection contained insects from all orders. A crisis in the insurance industry in 1873 led to his selling off all his collections to the British Museum and the Hope collections at Oxford. He retiring to Worthing, Sussex, in 1874, and after the death of his second wife, he married Sarah, daughter of Robert Cholmeley, in 1877. He took an interest in gardening until his death. The orchid genus Saundersia was named in his honour by Reichenbach. His four sons and three daughters included William Frederick Saunders (1834–1901), George Sharp Saunders (1842–1910), Edward Saunders (1848–1910), and Mary Anne Saunders (d. 1927) who married Thomas Roscoe Rede Stebbing (1835–1926).

Saunder's Diptera collection contained many new species. These were described in a series of papers by Francis Walker entitled Insecta Saundersiana.

"Nearly two thousand of my Coleoptera, and many hundreds of my butterflies, have been already described by various eminent naturalists, British and foreign; but a much larger number remains undescribed. Among those to whom science is most indebted for this laborious work, I must name Mr. F. P. Pascoe, late President of the Entomological Society of London, who had almost completed the classification and description of my large collection of Longicorn beetles (now in his possession), comprising more than a thousand species, of which at least nine hundred were previously undescribed and new to European cabinets. The remaining orders of insects, comprising probably more than two thousand species, are in the collection of Mr. William Wilson Saunders, who has caused the larger portion of them to be described by good entomologists. The Hymenoptera alone amounted to more than nine hundred species, among which were two hundred and eighty different kinds of ants, of which two hundred were new ". Alfred R. Wallace- The Malay Archipelago.

The Saunders collection contained 52 new species of stick insects (Phasmida) which were described by H.W. Bates in 1865.

== Other sources ==
- Lee, Sidney, ed. (1897). "Saunders, William Wilson" . Dictionary of National Biography. Vol. 50. London: Smith, Elder & Co.
- Bates, H.W. (1865) Descriptions of Fifty-two New Species of Phasmidae from the Collection of Mr. W. Wilson Saunders, with Remarks on the Family. Transactions of the Linnean Society of London, 25(1): 321-359 & plates XLIV & XLV.
