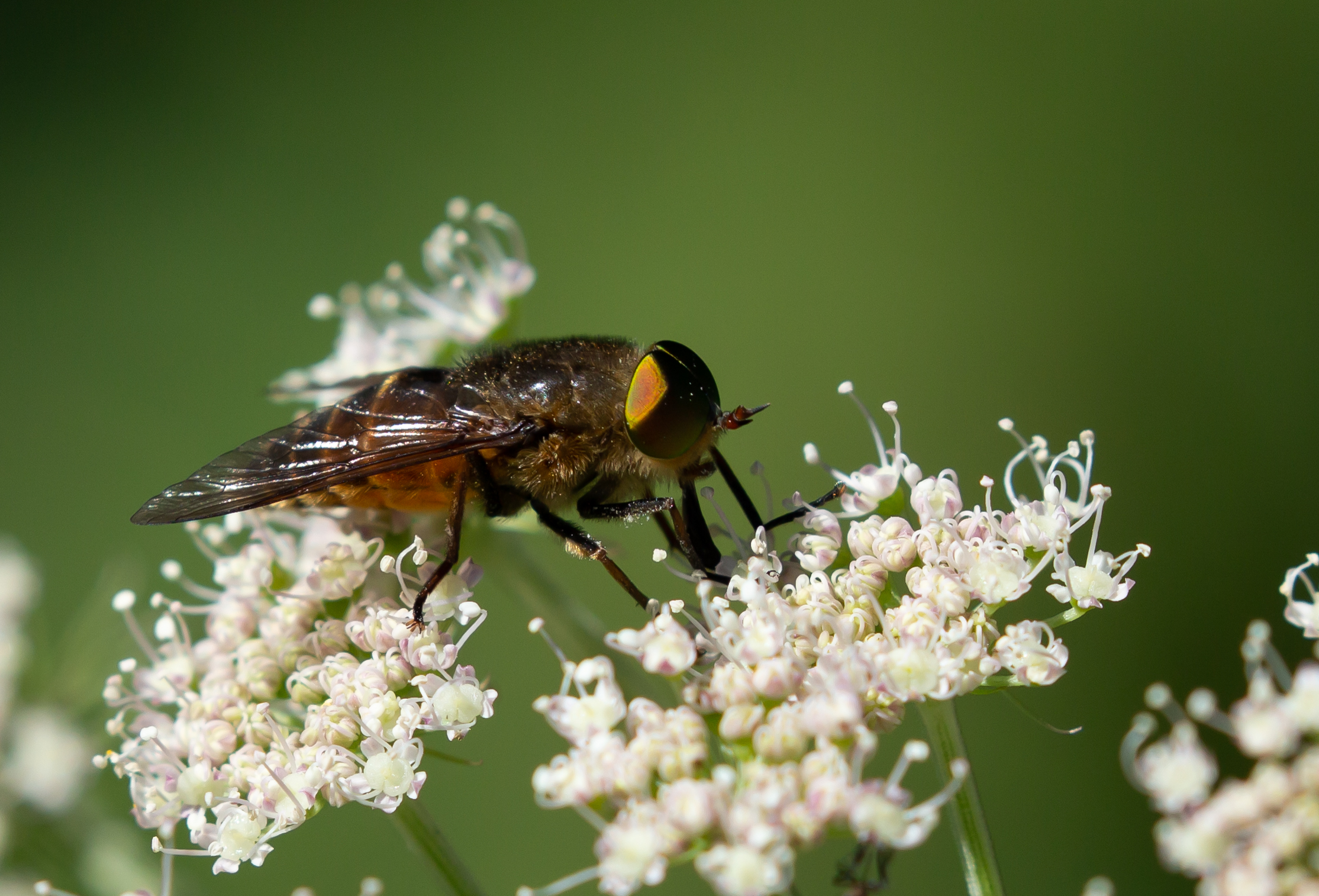

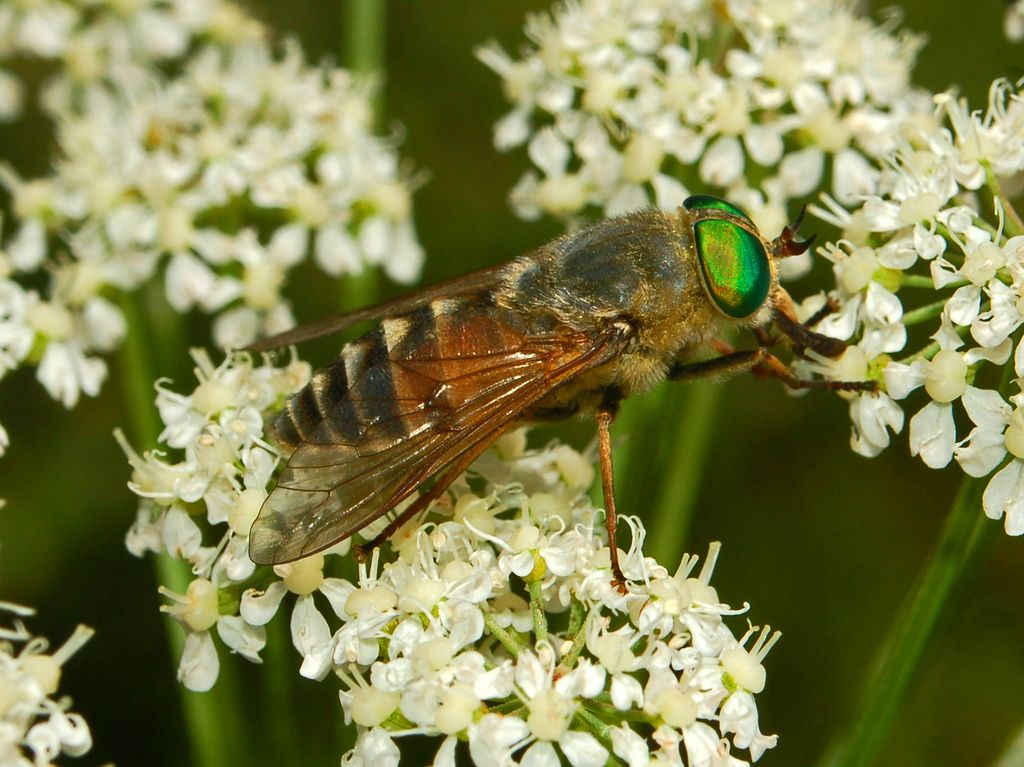
- Male (top) and female (bottom)

Scientific classification
- Kingdom: Animalia
- Phylum: Arthropoda
- Class: Insecta
- Order: Diptera
- Family: Tabanidae
- Subfamily: Tabaninae
- Tribe: Diachlorini
- Genus: Philipomyia
- Species: P. aprica

Binomial name
- Philipomyia aprica Meigen, 1820

Synonyms
- Tabanus aprica Meigen, 1820; Tabanus infuscatus Loew, 1858; Tabanus zizaniae Leclercq, 1967

= Philipomyia aprica =

Species of fly

Philipomyia aprica is a species of horse fly of the family Tabanidae, subfamily Tabaninae.

== Distribution ==
This horse fly is present in most of Europe and in the Near East (Caucasia, Turkey, Iran) .

== Description ==
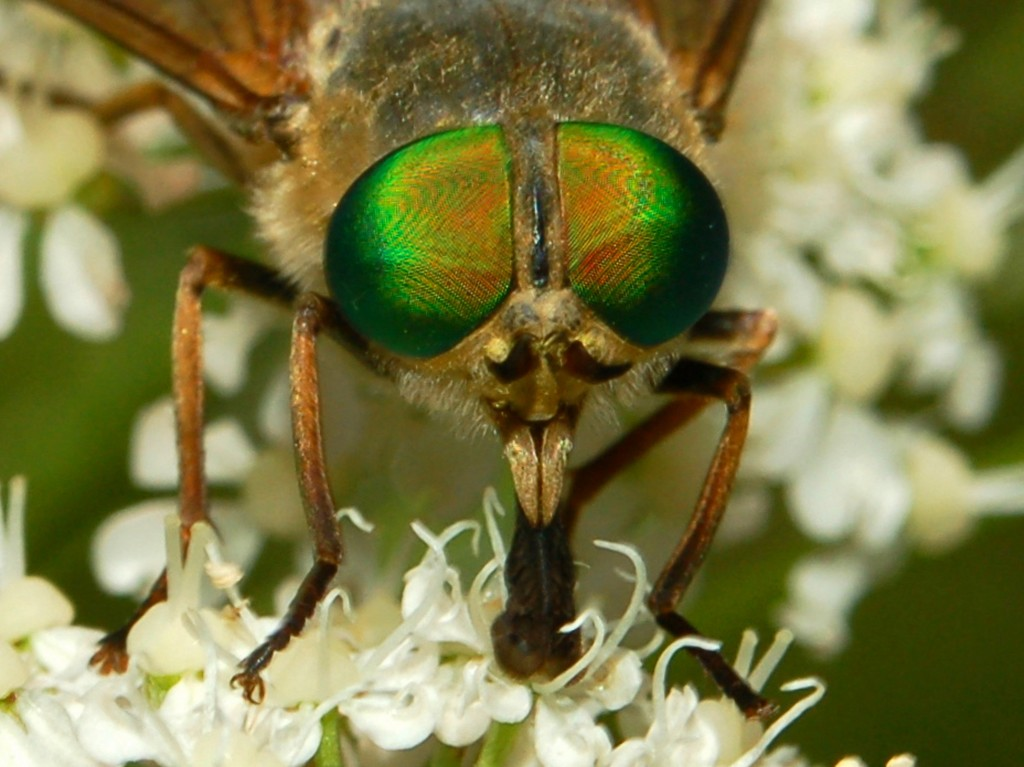
Close-up on female

The adult females grow up to 18 millimetres (0.71 in) long. Their large compound eyes are bright green, without hairs and ocular bands. The terminal of antennae is brownish-black. The thorax is dark-brown and quite hairy. The abdomen has clearer bands at the end of each black tergite. Wings and legs are yellowish-brown. Halteres are brownish-yellow.

== Biology ==
These common horse flies can be encountered in Summer in high mountain at an altitude of over 2000 meters during the daylight hours, when they mainly feed on nectar of flowers (especially of Apiaceae species). Females attack mainly horses and cattle.
