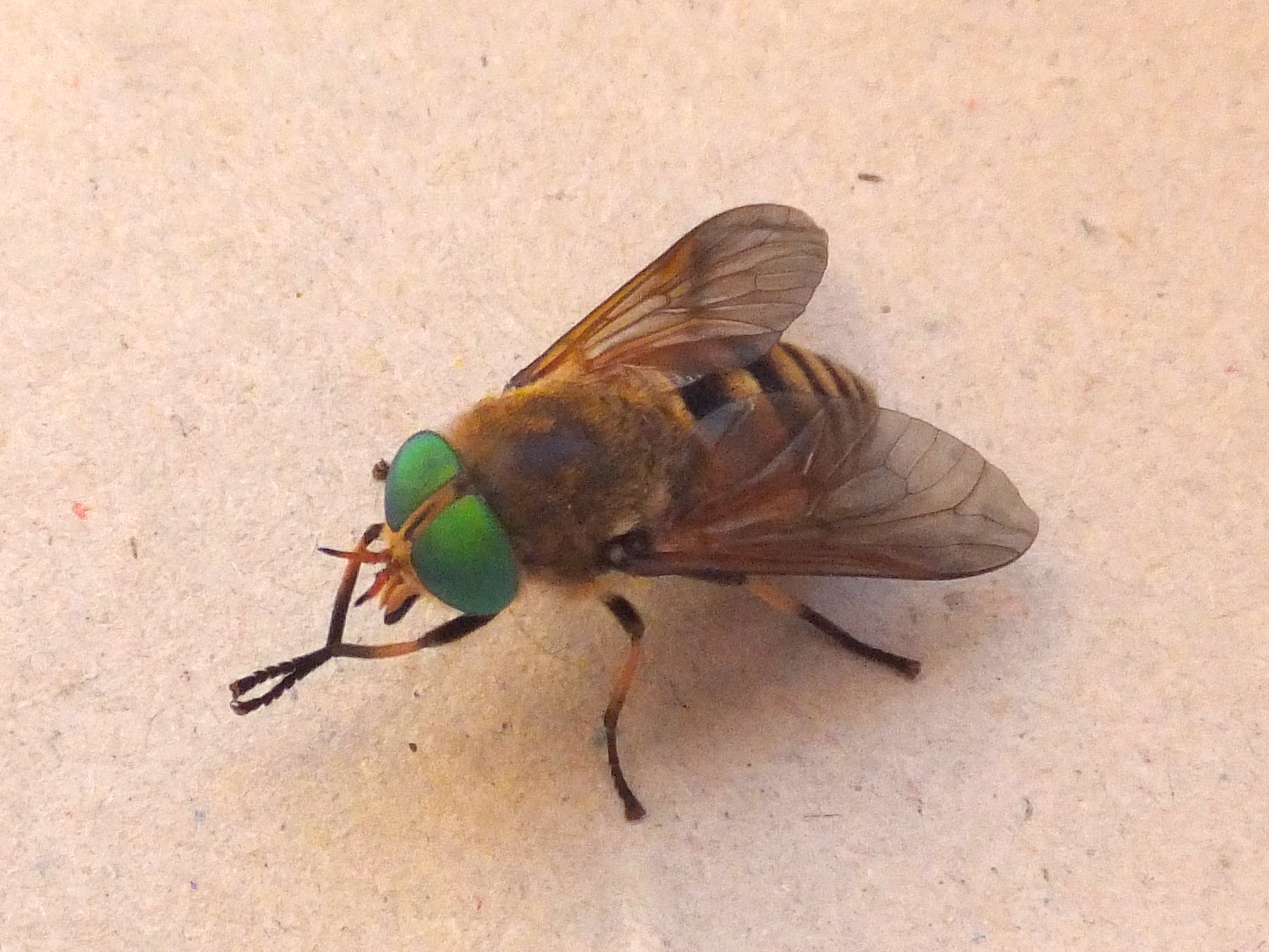
- Philipomyia aprica

Scientific classification
- Kingdom: Animalia
- Phylum: Arthropoda
- Class: Insecta
- Order: Diptera
- Family: Tabanidae
- Subfamily: Tabaninae
- Tribe: Diachlorini
- Genus: Philipomyia; Olsufjev, 1964

Type species
- Tabanus graceus Fabricius, 1794

= Philipomyia =

Genus of flies

Philipomyia is a genus of horse fly belonging to the family Tabanidae subfamily Tabaninae.

These flies are found in most of Europe and in the Near East.

== Species ==
- Philipomyia aprica (Meigen, 1820)
- Philipomyia graeca (Fabricius, 1794)
- Philipomyia rohdendorfi (Olsufjev, 1937)
