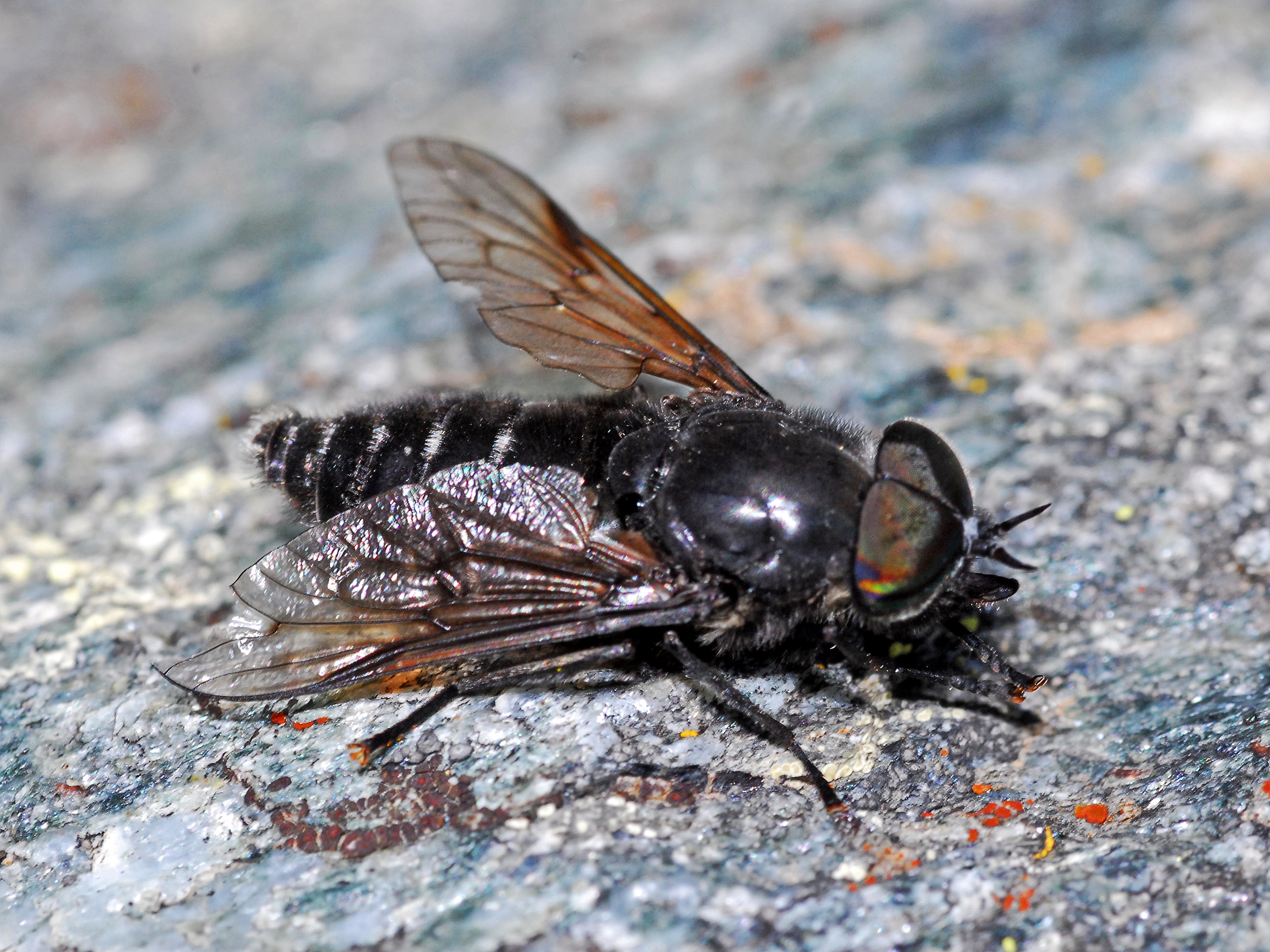
- Male

Scientific classification
- Kingdom: Animalia
- Phylum: Arthropoda
- Class: Insecta
- Order: Diptera
- Family: Tabanidae
- Subfamily: Tabaninae
- Tribe: Diachlorini
- Genus: Dasyrhamphis
- Species: D. umbrinus

Binomial name
- Dasyrhamphis umbrinus (Meigen, 1820)

Synonyms
- Tabanus umbrinus Meigen, 1820

= Dasyrhamphis umbrinus =

Species of fly

Dasyrhamphis umbrinus is a species of horse fly, a fly in the family Tabanidae, native to Europe and near East Asia.

== Distribution ==
This species is present in Europe (Albania, Bosnia and Herzegovina, Bulgaria, Croatia, European Turkey, Greece, Italy, Republic of North Macedonia, Slovenia, Yugoslavia and Romania) and in the Near East.

== Description ==
Dasyrhamphis umbrinus can reach a body length of about 11–14.5 mm (0.43–0.57 in). These 'horse flies' are mostly blackish, with clear showing a distinct dark brown spot close to the middle of the anterior margin and near the base of discal cell. Eyes shows a microscopical pubescence. Frontal calli are well-developed. The 3rd antennal segment is slender and less developed.
