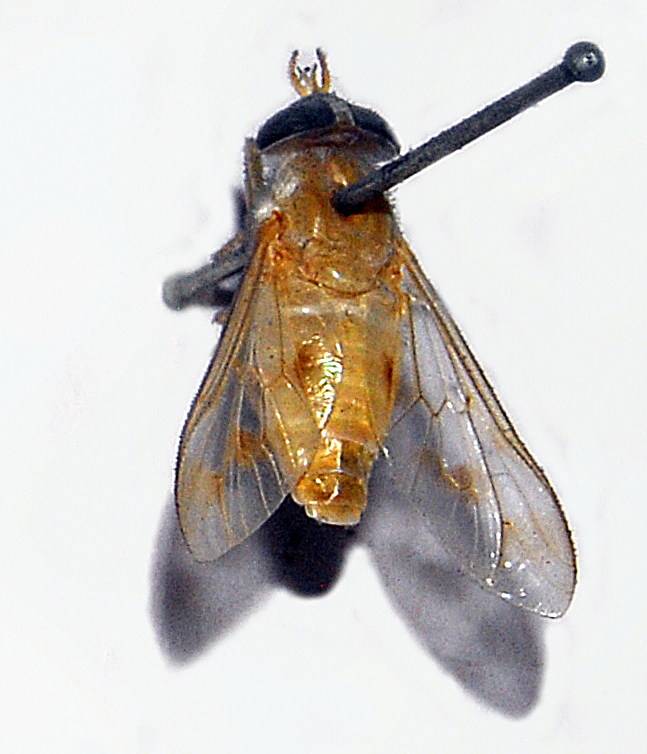
- Dichelacera alcicornis. Museum specimen

Scientific classification
- Kingdom: Animalia
- Phylum: Arthropoda
- Class: Insecta
- Order: Diptera
- Family: Tabanidae
- Subfamily: Tabaninae
- Tribe: Diachlorini
- Genus: Dichelacera
- Species: D. alcicornis

Binomial name
- Dichelacera alcicornis (Wiedemann, 1828)

Synonyms
- Tabanus alcicornis Wiedemann, 1828

= Dichelacera alcicornis =

Species of fly

Dichelacera alcicornis is a species of horse flies in the family Tabanidae.

== Distribution ==
This species is present in Brazil (Minas Gerais to Santa Catarina) and Argentina (Mendoza).
