= Stypommisa punctipennis =

Scientific classification
- Kingdom: Animalia
- Phylum: Arthropoda
- Class: Insecta
- Order: Diptera
- Family: Tabanidae
- Subfamily: Tabaninae
- Tribe: Diachlorini
- Genus: Stypommisa
- Species: S. punctipennis

Binomial name
- Stypommisa punctipennis Enderlein, 1923

Species of fly

Stypommisa punctipennis is a species of horse flies in the family Tabanidae.

== Distribution ==
Brazil, Argentina.
