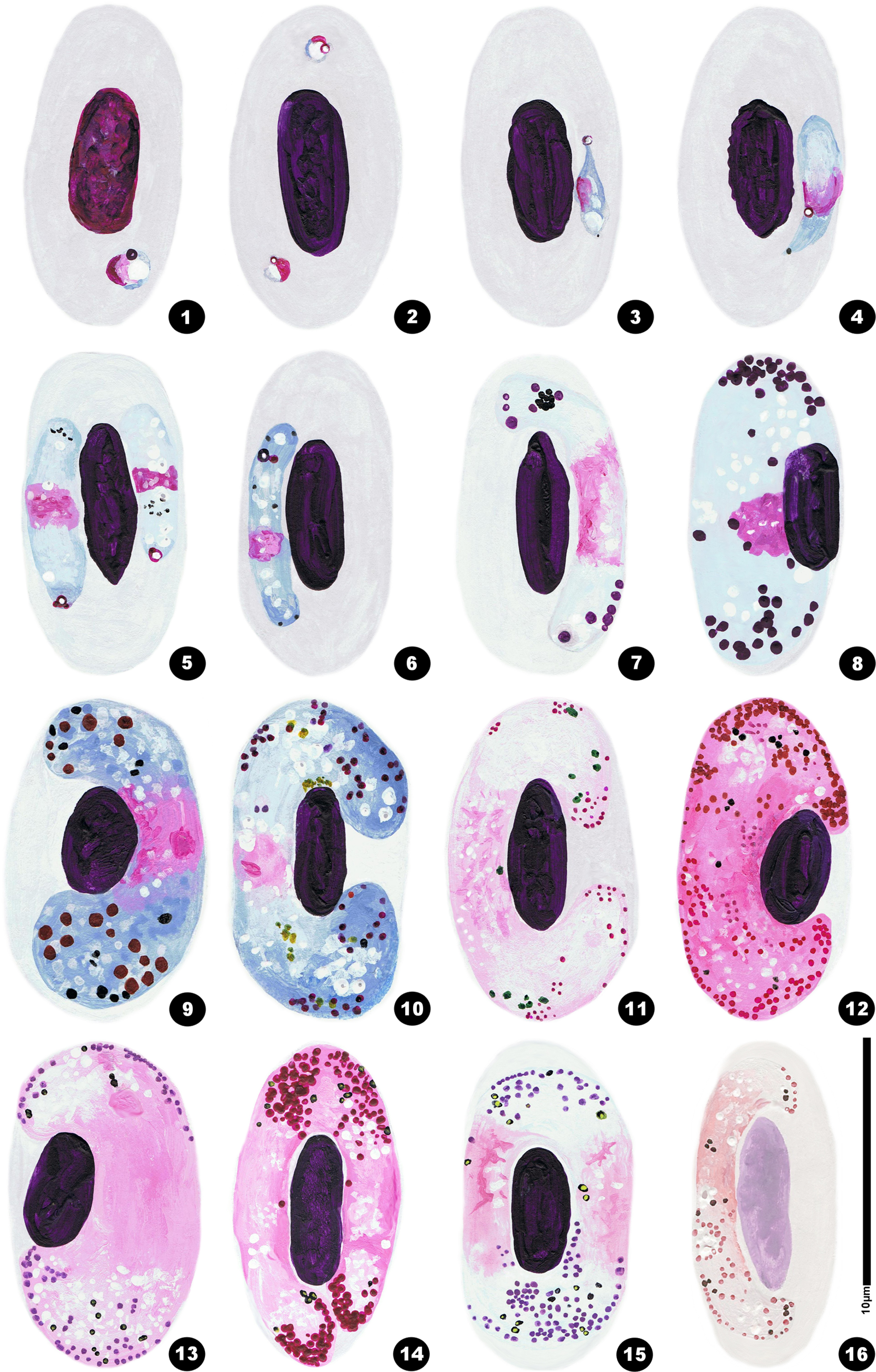
- H. syrnii

Scientific classification
- Domain: Eukaryota
- Clade: Sar
- Clade: Alveolata
- Phylum: Apicomplexa
- Class: Aconoidasida
- Order: Chromatorida
- Family: Haemoproteidae
- Genus: Haemoproteus; Kruse, 1890

Species
- See text

= Haemoproteus =

Genus of single-celled organisms

Haemoproteus is a genus of alveolates that are parasitic in birds, reptiles, and amphibians. Its name is derived from Greek: haima 'blood' and Proteus, a sea god that had the power to assume various shapes. The name Haemoproteus was first used in the description of H. columbae in the blood of the pigeon Columba livia by Walther Kruse in 1890. This was also the first description of this genus. Two other genera—Halteridium and Simondia—are now considered to be synonyms of Haemoproteus.

The protozoa are intracellular parasites that infect the erythrocytes. They are transmitted by blood-sucking insects including mosquitoes, biting midges (Culicoides), louse flies (Hippoboscidae) and horse-flies ("tabanids", "tabanid flies"). Infection with this genus is sometimes known as pseudomalaria because of the parasites' similarities with Plasmodium species.

Within the genus there are at least 173 species, 5 varieties and 1 subspecies. Of these over 140 occur in birds, 16 in reptiles and 3 in amphibia: 14 orders and 50 families of birds are represented. These include gamebirds (Galliformes), waterfowl (Anseriformes), raptors (Accipitriformes, Falconiformes, Strigiformes), pigeons and doves (Columbiformes), and perching birds or songbirds (Passeriformes).

== Taxonomy and systematics ==
=== Evolution ===
The earliest known fossil is of a Haemoproteus-like organism (Paleohaemoproteus burmacis) was found in the abdominal cavity of a female biting midge trapped 100 million years ago in amber found in Myanmar.

=== Taxonomic history ===
The first description of this genus was in 1890 by Kruse, who described H. columbae in the blood of the pigeon Columba livia. McCallum in 1897 showed that the process of exflagellation was part of sexual reproduction in these parasites and thought it probable that the same process occurred in Plasmodium. The first record of a haemoproteid parasite in a reptile was by Simond in 1901 who gave it the name H. metchnikovi. The Sergent brothers in 1906 showed that the ectoparasitic fly Pseudolynchia canariensis was the vector of H. columbae. Aragao in 1908 demonstrated the schizogonic stages of H. columbae in the endothelial cells of the lungs of nestling pigeons infected by the bite of infected Pseudolynchia. It was generally believed that transmission of the parasites was by regurgitation during a blood meal until Adie showed that the parasites develop in the salivary glands in a fashion analogous to that of Plasmodium in mosquitoes.

The genus Halterium was created by the French parasitologist Alphonse Labbe for a species he observed with gametocytes in erythrocytes, with pigment granules, and halter-shaped when fully formed. This genus was soon subsumed into the genus Haemoproteus.

The genus Haemocystidium was created to give a name to the haemoproteid of a gecko belonging to the genus Hemidactylus in Sri Lanka by Castellani and Willey in 1904. A second species in this genus was described in 1909 by Johnston and Cleland who found pigmented gametocytes in the blood of the Australian tortoise Chelodina longicollis. These species were transferred to Haemoproteus in 1926 by Wenyon.

The genus was resurrected by Garnham in 1966 when he created a new generic name — Simondia — for the haemoproteids of chelonians. He followed the opinions of Wenyon, Hewitt and DeGiusti and suggested that all these parasites belonged to the one species — Simondia metchnikovi. He retained the name Haemocystidium for the haemoproteids of lizards.

A different genus of vectors was identified in 1957 by Fallis and Wood when they identified H. nettionis in Culicoides downesi Wirth and Hubert in Ontario, Canada.

Levine and Campbell in 1971 moved all the species in Simondia and Haemocystidium into Haemoproteus, an opinion that was followed by subsequent authors.

The genus Haemocystidium was resurrected again by Telford in 1996 when he described three new species of protozoa in geckos from Pakistan.

This genus like those of many protozoa may be further modified once additional DNA sequences are available. For instance, many DNA sequences have been identified for Haemoproteus in birds around the world in recent years, leading to new knowledge about the previously unknown diversity of this parasite in different regions.

=== Subgenera ===
The species infecting avian hosts have been divided into two subgenera — Haemoproteus and Parahaemoproteus — a division proposed in 1965 by Bennett et al.. These may be distinguished as follows:

Haemoproteus: Vectors are hippoboscid flies (Hippoboscidae). Exflagellation does not occur below 20 degrees Celsius. Mature oocysts have diameters greater than 20 micrometres. The average length of the sporozoites is less than 10 micrometres. One end of the sporozoite is more pointed than the other. Although the majority are parasites of the Columbiformes, some species from this subgenus have also been reported in the Charadriiformes, Pelecaniformes and Suliformes.

Parahaemoproteus: Parasites of birds other than the Columbiformes. Vectors are biting midges (Ceratopogonidae). Exflagellation occurs below 20 °C (68 °F). Mature oocysts have diameters less than 20 micrometres. The average length of the sporozoites is greater than 10 micrometres. Both ends of the sporozoite are equally pointed.

While it was previously thought that Haemoproteus was limited to doves and related species, species in this genus have been isolated from frigatebirds.

=== Species list ===
Select 'show' (at right) to expand list

- Haemoproteus aegnithidae
- Haemoproteus aegyptius
- Haemoproteus africanus
- Haemoproteus alaudae
- Haemoproteus anatolicum
- Haemoproteus anthi
- Haemoproteus antigonis
- Haemoproteus asturisdussumieri
- Haemoproteus attenatus
- Haemoproteus balearicae
- Haemoproteus balli
- Haemoproteus balmorali
- Haemoproteus bambusicolae
- Haemoproteus bennetti
- Haemoproteus brachiatus
- Haemoproteus beckeri
- Haemoproteus belopolskyi
- Haemoproteus bennetti
- Haemoproteus borgesi
- Haemoproteus brodkorbi
- Haemoproteus bubalornis
- Haemoproteus bucerotis
- Haemoproteus canachites
- Haemoproteus caprimulgi
- Haemoproteus catharti
- Haemoproteus catenatus
- Haemoproteus cellii
- Haemoproteus centropi
- Haemoproteus chelodina
- Haemoproteus coatneyi
- Haemoproteus columbae
- Haemoproteus concavocentralis
- Haemoproteus cornuata
- Haemoproteus crumenius
- Haemoproteus cyanomitrae
- Haemoproteus danilewskyi
- Haemoproteus desseri
- Haemoproteus dicaeus
- Haemoproteus dicruri
- Haemoproteus dolniki
- Haemoproteus edomensis
- Haemoproteus elani
- Haemoproteus enucleator
- Haemoproteus forresteri
- Haemoproteus fringillae
- Haemoproteus fusca
- Haemoproteus gabaldoni
- Haemoproteus garnhami
- Haemoproteus geochelonis
- Haemoproteus greineri
- Haemoproteus goodmani
- Haemoproteus halcyonis
- Haemoproteus handai
- Haemoproteus hirundinis
- Haemoproteus himalayanus
- Haemoproteus homobelopolskyi
- Haemoproteus homopalloris
- Haemoproteus homovelans
- Haemoproteus hudaidensis
- Haemoproteus iwa
- Haemoproteus janovyi
- Haemoproteus jenniae
- Haemoproteus khani
- Haemoproteus kopki
- Haemoproteus krylovi
- Haemoproteus lanii
- Haemoproteus lari
- Haemoproteus lophortyx
- Haemoproteus kopki
- Haemoproteus maccallumi
- Haemoproteus mackerrasi
- Haemoproteus macrovacuolatus
- Haemoproteus madagascariensis
- Haemoproteus majoris
- Haemoproteus mansoni
- Haemoproteus mathislegeri
- Haemoproteus melopeliae
- Haemoproteus meleagridis
- Haemoproteus meropis
- Haemoproteus mesnili
- Haemoproteus metchnikovi
- Haemoproteus micronuclearis
- Haemoproteus minutus
- Haemoproteus motacillae
- Haemoproteus multipigmentatus
- Haemoproteus multivolutinus
- Haemoproteus nebraskensis
- Haemoproteus nettionis
- Haemoproteus nisi
- Haemoproteus noctuae
- Haemoproteus nucleofascialis
- Haemoproteus nucleophilus
- Haemoproteus oedurae
- Haemoproteus orioli
- Haemoproteus oryzivora
- Haemoproteus ovalis
- Haemoproteus pallidus
- Haemoproteus pallidulus
- Haemoproteus palumbis
- Haemoproteus pasteris
- Haemoproteus pastoris
- Haemoproteus parabelopolskyi
- Haemoproteus paramultipigmentatus
- Haemoproteus paranucleophilus
- Haemoproteus paruli
- Haemoproteus passeris
- Haemoproteus payevskyi
- Haemoproteus peltocephali
- Haemoproteus peircei
- Haemoproteus pelouri
- Haemoproteus phyllodactyli
- Haemoproteus piresi
- Haemoproteus plataleae
- Haemoproteus pratosi
- Haemoproteus prognei
- Haemoproteus psittaci
- Haemoproteus pteroclis
- Haemoproteus ptyodactyli
- Haemoproteus quelea
- Haemoproteus raymundi
- Haemoproteus rileyi
- Haemoproteus rupicola
- Haemoproteus sacharovi
- Haemoproteus sanguinus
- Haemoproteus sanîosdiasï
- Haemoproteus sauianae
- Haemoproteus sequeirae
- Haemoproteus serini
- Haemoproteus silvaï
- Haemoproteus sturni
- Haemoproteus sylvae
- Haemoproteus syrnii
- Haemoproteus tarentolae
- Haemoproteus tartakovskyi
- Haemoproteus telfordi
- Haemoproteus tendeiroi
- Haemoproteus tinnunculi
- Haemoproteus thraupi
- Haemoproteus trionyxi
- Haemoproteus turtur
- Haemoproteus uraeginthus
- Haemoproteus vacuolatus
- Haemoproteus valkiūnasi
- Haemoproteus vangii
- Haemoproteus velans
- Haemoproteus vireonis
- Haemoproteus wenyoni
- Haemoproteus witti
- Haemoproteus xantholemae
- Haemoproteus zosteropsis

== Life cycle ==
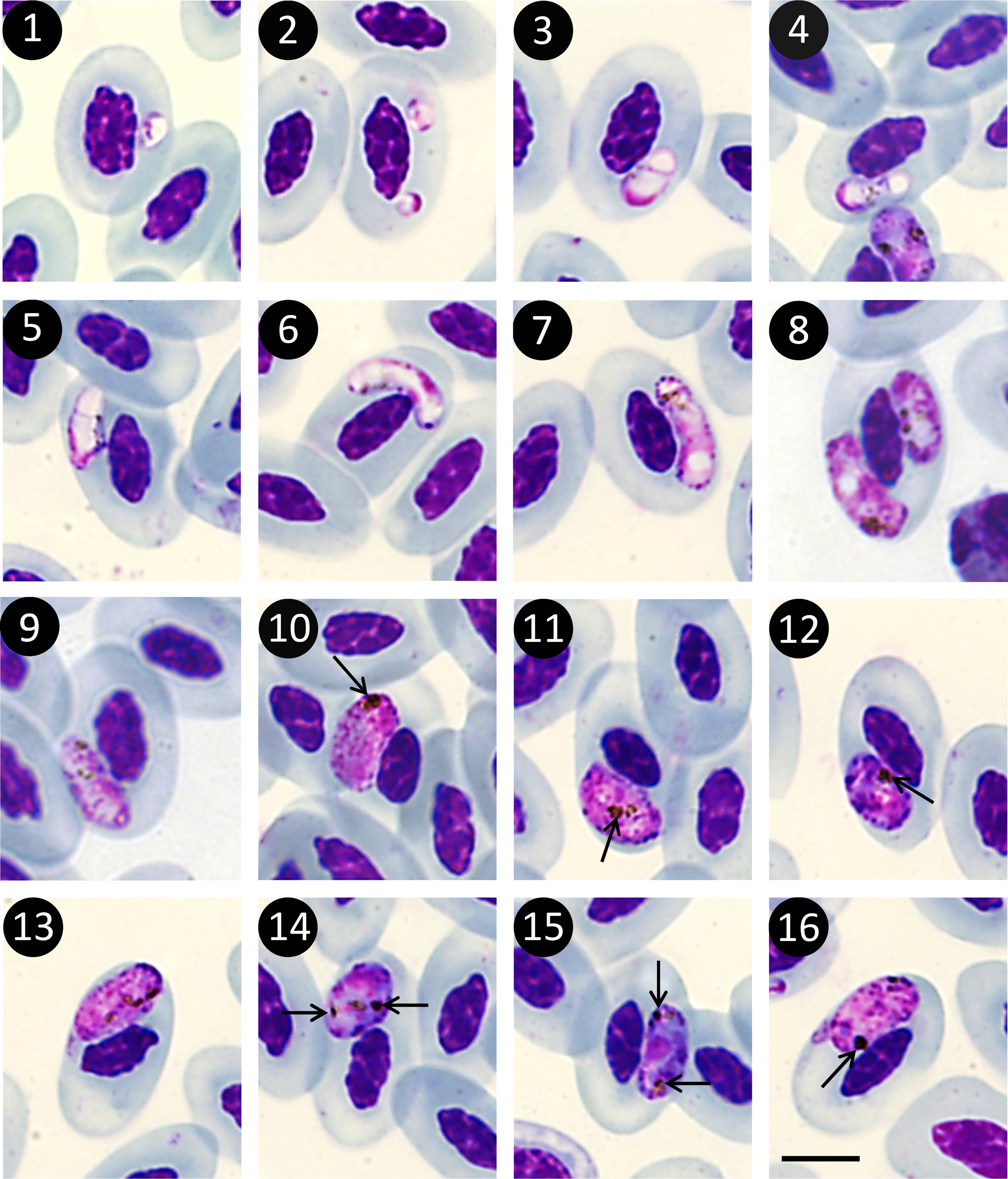
Haemoproteus ilanpapernai

The infective stage is the sporozoite which is present in the salivary glands of the vector. Once the vector bites a new host, the sporozoites enter the blood stream and invade endothelial cells of blood vessels within various tissues including those of the lung, liver and spleen. Within the endothelial cells, the sporozoites undergo asexual reproduction becoming schizonts. These in turn produce numerous merozoites which penetrate the erythrocytes and mature into either female gametocytes (macrogametocytes) or male gametocytes (microgametocytes). Gametocytes can then be ingested by another blood-sucking insect where they undergo sexual reproduction in the midgut of the insect to produce oocysts. The oocysts rupture and release numerous sporozoites that invade the salivary gland and serve as a focus of subsequent infection for another host once the insect takes its next blood meal.

== Description ==
Only gametocytes are found in the blood. Asexual reproduction occurs in body organs, especially the liver. The organisms occupy the majority of the cytoplasm, leaving the light magenta, finely granular, pink nucleus centrally located.

Taxonomy of this genus is difficult as there are few distinct morphological differences between the recognised species. Many of them were described under the 'one species-one host' hypothesis which is now thought to be potentially misleading. The morphological features most commonly used to describe a species include the number of pigment granules, the degree of encirclement of the host nucleus, the size of the parasite, the degree of host nucleus displacement and the degree of host cell enlargement. DNA studies should help to clarify this area but to date have rarely been undertaken.

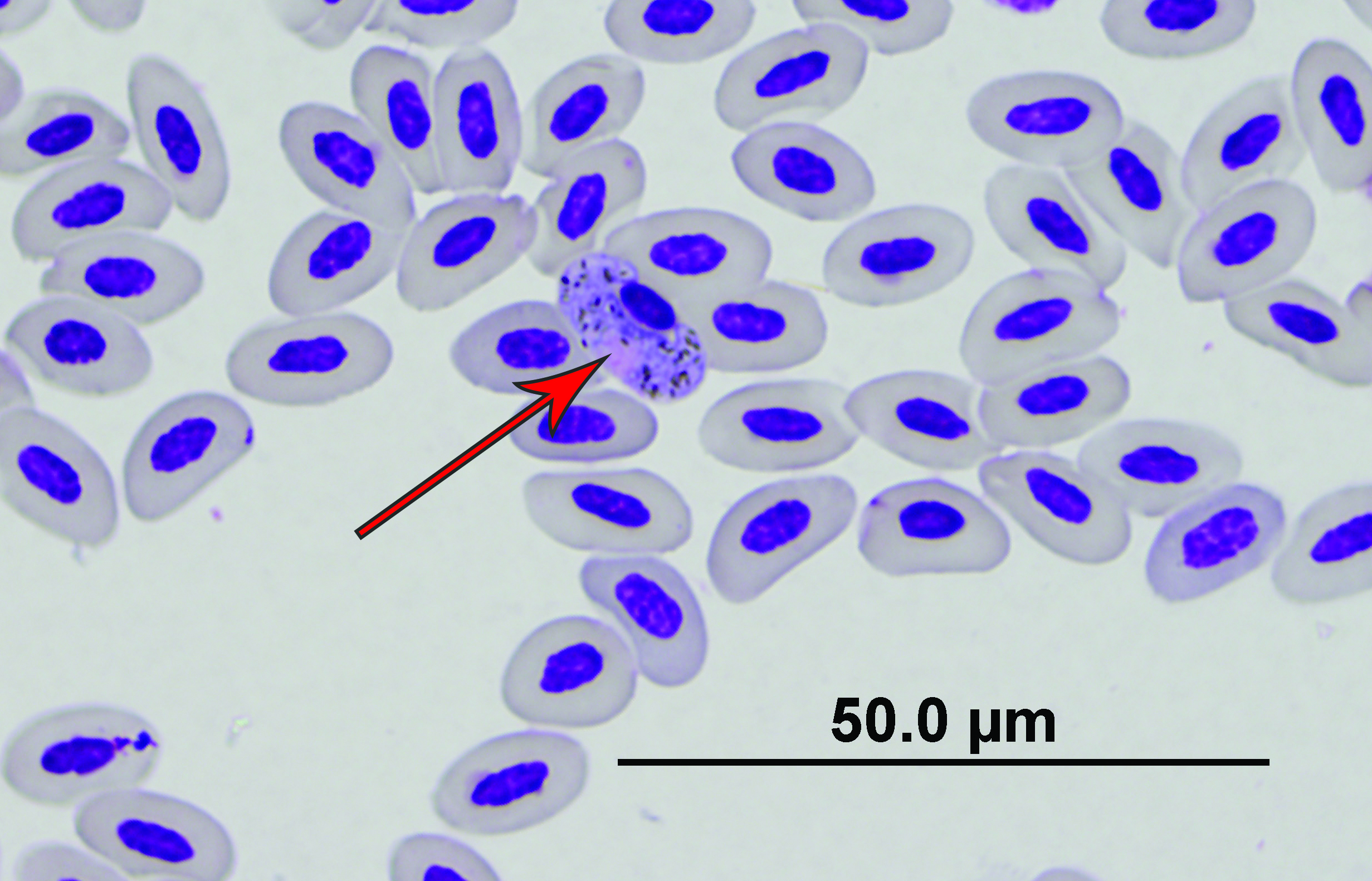
Haemoproteus nettionis

The gametocytes have five basic forms:

- thin gametocytes with incomplete margins (H. balearicae, H. pelouri)
- halterial gametocytes (H. maccullumi)
- thick sausage shaped gametocytes that fill most of the host cell and displace the host nucleus laterally (H. halyconis, H. plataleae)
- gametocytes that encircle the host nucleus and fill the host cell (H. telfordi)
- straight gametocytes that normally occur in anucleate cells and are almost as long as the host cell (H. enucleator)

=== Diagnostic criteria ===
- Gametocytes are only present within erythrocytes
- Gametocytes have a "halter-shaped" appearance with little displacement of the host nucleus
- Schizonts are not seen on peripheral blood smears
- Multiple pigment granules (hemozoin) are present within the erythrocytes

Pigment granules are refractile and yellow to brown in colour.

== Pathology ==
Infections with most Haemoproteus species appear to produce subclinical infections.

Post-mortem findings include enlargement of the spleen, liver and kidneys. These organs may appear chocolate-brown due to hemozoin deposition. Cytologic imprints may reveal schizont-laden endothelial cells. Some species of Haemoproteus will also form large, cyst-like bodies within the skeletal muscles that resembling those seen with Sarcocystis species infections.

Pigeons infected with H. columbae may develop enlarged gizzards; and anemia has been recorded.

Flocks of bobwhite quail (Colinus virginianus) may become infected with H. lophortyx. Infected birds may suffer from reluctance to move, ruffled appearance, prostration and death. Other findings include parasitemia and anemia. Large megaloschizonts may be present in skeletal muscles, particularly those of the thighs and back. The average cumulative mortality for flocks experiencing outbreaks may be over 20%.

Experimental infection of turkeys with H. meleagridis resulted in lameness, diarrhea, depression, emaciation, anorexia and occasionally anemia.

Muscovey ducks infected with H. nettionis suffered lameness, dyspnea and sudden death.

In other avian species, anemia and anorexia have been reported occasionally. Importantly, new records of Haemoproteus are discovered constantly and should still be monitored for effects on host condition.

== Effect on vectors ==
H. columbae infects rock pigeons (Columba livia) and is vectored by a hippoboscid fly (Pseudolynchia canariensis). Both sexes of the vector can transmit the parasite. Species of the Hippoboscoidea, the superfamily to which Ps. canariensis, belongs do not lay eggs. Instead the larvae hatch in utero, are fed internally by "milk glands," and pass through three morphological stages before being deposited to pupate. The survival of female flies is significantly reduced when they are infected with the parasite. In contrast, no effect is seen on male fly survival. In addition, the females produce fewer offspring when infected but the quality of the offspring does not seem to be affected.

== Host records ==
=== Avian hosts ===
- H. anthi — yellow wagtails (Motacilla flava)
- H. antigonis — Florida sandhill crane (Grus canadensis pratensis)
- H. balearicae — black crowned crane (Balearica pavonina gibbericeps, B. p. pavonina), Florida sandhill crane (Grus canadensis pratensis)
- H. bambusicolae — bamboo partridge (Bambusicola thoracica sonorivox)
- H. beckeri — gray catbird (Dumetella carolinensis)
- H. (Parahaemoproteus) belopolskyi — blackcaps (Sylvia atricapilla)
- H. bennetti — greater yellownape (Picus flavinucha)
- H. borgesi — red cockaded woodpecker (Picoides borealis)
- H. brachiatus — saker falcon (Falco cherrug)
- H. bucerotis — red billed hornbill (Tockus erythrorhynchus)
- H. (Parahaemoproteus) canachites — grouse
- H. (Parahaemoproteus) catharti — turkey vulture (Cathartes aura)
- H. (Parahaemoproteus) coatneyi — bananaquit (Coereba flaveola), white-crowned sparrows (Zonotrichia leucophrys)
- H. (Haemoproteus) columbae — Japanese black wood pigeons (Columba janthina), pigeon (Columba livia), doves (Columbina talpacoti, Scardafella squammata, Zenaida auriculata), laughing dove (Stigmatopelia senegalensis), eastern white-winged doves (Z. asiatica asiatica), mourning doves (Z. macroura)
- H. (Parahaemoproteus) concavocentralis — hawfinch (Coccothraustes coccothraustes)
- H. cornuata — coppersmith barbet (Megalaima haemacephala)
- H. crumenium — wood stork (Mycteria americana)
- H. (Parahaemoproteus) cyanomitrae — olive sunbird (Nectarinia olivacea, Cyanomitra olivacea)
- H. (Parahaemoproteus) danilewskyi — blue jays (Cyanocitta cristata)
- H. (Parahaemoproteus) desseri — blossom headed parakeet (Psittacula roseata)
- H. dicruri — fork tailed drongo (Dicrurus adsimilis), crested drongos (D. forficatus)
- H. elani — Cooper's hawk (Astur cooperii), sharp shinned hawk (A. striatus)
- H. enucleator — kingfisher (Ispidina picta)
- H. (Parahaemoproteus) fringillae — rufous-winged (Aimophila carpalis), house finch (Carpodacus mexicanus), hawfinch (Coccothraustes coccothraustes), oriental magpie robin (Copsychus saularis), dark-eyed juncos (Junco hyemalis), American redstarts (Setophaga ruticilla)
- H. forresteri — rufous-headed ground-roller (Atelornis crossleyi)
- H. gabaldoni — Muscovy duck (Cairina moschata)
- H. (Parahaemoproteus) garnhami — sparrows
- H. goodmani — pitta-like ground-roller (Atelornis pittoides)
- H. greineri — wood ducks (Aix sponsa), common mergansers (Mergus merganser), common pochard (Aythya ferina)
- H. handai — lesser sulphur-crested cockatoo (Cacatua sulphurea), plum-headed parakeet (Psittacula cyanocephala), ring necked parakeet (Psittacula krameri manillensis)
- H. himalayanus — rufous sibia (Heterophasia capistrata)
- H. (Parahaemoproteus) homobelopolskyi — red headed malimbe (Malimbus rubricollis), black headed weaver (Ploceus melanocephalus), red billed quelea (Quelea quelea)
- H. (Parahaemoproteus) homopalloris - wood warblers (Phylloscopus sibilatrix)
- H. (Parahaemoproteus) homovelans — grey-faced woodpecker (Picus canus)
- H. (Parahaemoproteus) hudaidensis — blue checked bee-eater (Merops superciliosus persicus Pallas)
- H. ilanpapernai — spotted wood owl (Strix seloputo), Brown Hawk-Owl (Ninox scutulata)
- H. iwa — great frigatebirds (Fregata minor), magnificent frigatebirds (F. magnificens)
- H. janovyi — whitebacked vulture (Gyps africanus), hooded vulture (Necrosyrtes monachus), white-headed vulture (Trigonoceps occipitalis) lappet faced vulture (Torgos tracheliotus)
- H. (Haemoproteus) jenniae — swallow tailed gull (Creagrus furcatus)
- H. khani — crested drongos (Dicrurus forficatus)
- H. (Parahaemoproteus) lanii — red backed shrike (Lanius collurio), woodchat shrike (L. senator)
- H. lari — Caspian gulls (Larus cachinnans)
- H. (Parahaemoproteus) lophortyx — California quail (Callipepla californica), scaled quail (Callipepla squamata), bobwhite quail (Colinus virginianus)
- H. maccallumi — mourning doves (Zenaida macroura)
- H. macrovacuolatus — black-bellied whistling duck (Dendrocygna autumnalis)
- H. madagascariensis — hook billed vanga (Vanga curvirostris)
- H. majoris — Swainson's thrush (Catharus ustulatus), blue tit (Cyanistes caeruleus), collared flycatcher (Ficedula albicollis), pied flycatcher (F. hypoleuca)
- H. mansoni — blue grouse (Dendragapus obscurus), ptarmigan (Lagopus lagopus)
- H. meleagridis — turkey (Meleagris gallopavo)
- H. (Parahaemoproteus) micronuclearis — red headed malimbe (Malimbus rubricollis), black headed weaver (Ploceus melanocephalus), red billed quelea (Quelea quelea)
- H. (Haemoproteus) multipigmentatus — Galapagos dove (Zenaida galapagoensis)
- H. motacillae — yellow wagtails (Motacilla flava)
- H. (Haemoproteus) multivolutinus — tambourine dove (Turtur timpanistria)
- H. (Parahaemoproteus) nettionis — wood ducks (Aix sponsa), blue-winged teals (Anas discors), Pekin duck (Anas platyrhynchos), lesser scaups (Aythya affinis), common pochard (Aythya ferina), ring-necked ducks (Aythya collaris), Muscovey duck (Cairina moschata), trumpeter swans (Cygnus buccinator)
- H. nisi — Cooper's hawk (Accipiter cooperii), sharp shinned hawk (A. striatus)
- H. (Parahaemoproteus) nucleofascialis — red headed malimbe (Malimbus rubricollis), black headed weaver (Ploceus melanocephalus), red billed quelea (Quelea quelea)
- H. noctuae — snowy owls (Nyctea scandiaca), spotted owl (Strix occidentalis)
- H. orioli — golden oriole (Oriolus oriolus)
- H. oryzivorae — oriental magpie robin (Copsychus saularis), Indian silverbill (Lonchura malabarica), tricoloured munia (L. malacca ruboniger), scaly-breasted munia (L. punctulata), baya weaver (Ploceus philippinus), jungle babbler (Turdoides striata)
- H. palumbus — pigeon (Columba palumbus palumbus)
- H. pallidus — pied flycatcher (Ficedula hypoleuca), collared flycatcher (F. albicollis)
- H. pallidulus — blackcap (Sylvia atricapilla)
- H. parabelopolskyi — blackcap (Sylvia atricapilla)
- H. (Haemoproteus) paramultipigmentatus — Socorro common ground dove (Columbina passerina socorroensis)
- H. passeris — Israeli house sparrow (Passer domesticus biblicus)
- H. pasteris — pied myna (Sturnus contra), grey headed myna (S. malabaricus)
- H. pastoris — greater blue eared glossy starling (Lamprotornis chalybaeus), pied myna (Sturnus contra)
- H. payevskyi — great reed warbler (Acrocephalus arundinaceus), marsh warbler (A. palustris)
- H. (Haemoproteus) piresi — pigeon (Columba livia)
- H. plataleae — glossy ibis (Plegadis falcinellus)
- H. pratosi — Ahanta francolin (Francolinus ahantensis)
- H. pratasi — helmeted guineafowl (Numida meleagris)
- H. prognei — purple martin (Progne subis)
- H. psittaci — African grey parrot (Psittacus erithacus)
- H. raymundi — eastern olive sunbird (Nectarinia olivacea)
- H. (Haemoproteus) sacharovi — eastern white-winged doves (Zenaida asiatica asiatica), mourning doves (Z. macroura)
- H. sangunis — red whiskered bulbul (Pycnonotus jocosus emeria)
- H. (Parahaemoproteus) sanîosdiasï — chicken (Gallus gallus)
- H. silvaï — guinea fowl (Numida meleagris mitrata)
- H. sylvae — great reed warbler (Acrocephalus arundinaceus)
- H. syrnii — tawny owl (Strix aluco), spotted owl (S. occidentalis), European scops owl (Otus scops)
- H. telfordi — MacQueen's bustards (Chlamydotis macqueenii), rufous-crested bustards (Eupodotis ruficrista), great bustard (Otis tarda)
- H. tendeiroi — MacQueen's bustards (Chlamydotis macqueenii), rufous-crested bustards (Eupodotis ruficrista), great bustard (Otis tarda)
- H. tinnunculi — American kestrel (Falco sparverius), Chimango caracara (Milvago chimango)
- H. (Haemoproteus) turtur — turtle dove (Streptopelia turtur)
- H. (Parahaemoproteus) vacuolatus — yellow whiskered greenbul (Andropadus latirostris)
- H. (Parahaemoproteus) valkiūnasi — great frigatebirds (Fregata minor), lesser frigatebirds (F. ariel), Ascension frigatebirds (F. aquila)
- H. vangii — hook billed vanga (Vanga curvirostris)
- H. (Parahaemoproteus) velans — red-bellied woodpecker (Melanerpes carolinus), red-cockaded woodpecker (Picoides borealis)
- H. zosteropsis — oriental white eye (Zosterops palpebrosa palpebrosa)

=== Reptile hosts ===
- H. anatolicum — tortoise (Testudo graeca)
- H. balli — Egyptian cobra (Naja haje haje)
- H. chelodina — saw-shelled tortoise (Elseya latisternum)
- H. edomensis — lizard (Agama stellio)
- H. geochelonis — tortoise (Geochelone denticulata)
- H. kopki — spotted Indian house gecko (Hemidactylus brookei), giant frog eye gecko (Teratoscincus scincus)
- H. mackerrasi — Binoe's prickly gecko (Heteronotia binoei)
- H. mesnili — spitting cobra (Naja nigricollis)
- H. metchnikovi — turtle (Chrysemys picta), yellow bellied terrapin (Tramchemys scripta)
- H. oedurae — Australian northern velvet gecko (Oedura castelnaui)
- H. peltocephali — river turtle (Peltocephalus dumerilianus)
- H. phyllodactyli — gekkonid (Ptyodactylus elisa)
- H. ptyodactyli — Kramer's yellow fan-fingered gecko (Ptyodactylus hasselquistii)
- H. tarentolae — Moorish gecko (Tarentola mauritanica)
- H. trionyxi — Ganges softshell turtle (Trionyx gangeticus)

=== Amphibian hosts ===
- H. ovalis — cricket frog (Rana limnocharis)

== Hosts known to be infected but Haemoproteus species not identified ==
- common myna (Acridotheres tristis)
- Blyth's reed warbler (Acrocephalus dumetorum)
- sedge warblers (Acrocephalus schoenobaenus)
- reed warbler (Acrocephalus scirpaceus)
- clamorous reed warbler (Acrocephalus stentoreus)
- black throated sunbird (Aethopyga saturata)
- Spanish red-legged partridge (Alectoris rufa)
- imperial eagles (Aquila heliaca)
- canvasbacks (Aythya valisineria)
- white cockatoo (Cacatua alba)
- sulphur-crested cockatoo (Cacatua galerita)
- speckled pigeon (Columba guinea)
- white-rumped shama (Copsychus malabaricus)
- green jays (Cyanocorax yncas glaucescens)
- European bee-eaters (Merops apiaster)
- mute swan (Cygnus olor)
- magnificent bird of paradise (Diphyllodes magnificus hunsteini)
- red munia (Estrilda amandava)
- lesser kestrel (Falco naumanni)
- common kestrel (Falco tinnunculus)
- Swainson's francolin (Francolinus swainsonii)
- magnificent frigatebirds (Fregata magnificens)
- chaffinch (Fringilla coelebs)
- hill mynah (Gracula religiosa intermedia)
- long tailed shrike (Lanius schach)
- superb bird of paradise (Lophorina superba)
- Egyptian kites (Milvus migrans aegypticus)
- Guianan red-capped cardinal (Paroaria gularis gularis)
- lesser flamingos (Phoeniconaias minor)
- New Holland honeyeaters (Phylidonyris novaehollandiae)
- streaked weaver (Ploceus manyar)
- Surinam crested oropendola (Psarocolius decumanus decumanus)
- Montezuma oropendolas (Psarocolius montezuma)
- Guianan turquoise tanager (Tangara mexicana mexicana)
- blue-necked tanager (Tangara cyanicollis caeruleocephala)
- sacred ibis (Threskiornis aethiopicus)
- white-crowned sparrows (Zonotrichia leucophrys oriantha)

== Vectors ==
- H. balmorali — Culicoides impunctatus
- H. belopolskyi — Culicoides impunctatus
- H. columbae — Ornithomyia avicularia, Pseudolynchia canariensis
- H. danilewskyi — Culicoides arboricola, Culicoides edeni, Culicoides knowltoni
- H. dolniki — Culicoides impunctatus
- H. fringillae — Culicoides impunctatus
- H. lanii — Culicoides impunctatus
- H. lophortyx — Culicoides bottimeri, Lynchia hirsuta, Stilbometopa impressa
- H. metchinikovi — Chrysops callidus
- H. nettionis — Culicoides downesi
- H. sacharovi — Peseudolynchia maura
- H. syrnii — Ornithomyia avicularia
- H. tartakovskyi — Culicoides impunctatus
- H. turtur — Pseudolynchia canariensis

== Avian families affected ==
The concept of a "one host-one species" was originally used in the taxonomy of this genus as it appears that the parasites are at least moderately host specific. After this rule was found to be incorrect, it was suggested that the avian parasite species were limited to single avian families. From an inspection of the host records above it is clear that this is not the case.

The avian species known to be infected are listed below:

Order Accipitriformes

Family Accipitridae

- Cooper's hawk (Accipiter cooperii)
- Sharp shinned hawk (Accipiter striatus)
- Eastern imperial eagle (Aquila heliaca)
- White-backed vulture (Gyps africanus)
- Black kite (Milvus migrans)
- Hooded vulture (Necrosyrtes monachus)
- White-headed vulture (Trigonoceps occipitalis)
- Lappet faced vulture (Torgos tracheliotos)

A 2024 study found that the Haemoproteus species from accipitrid birds formed a distinct clade, found in these birds only and which might be classified into a separate subgenus or even genus.

Family Cathartidae

- Turkey vulture (Cathartes aura)

Order Anseriformes

Family Anatidae

- Wood duck (Aix sponsa)
- Blue winged teal (Anas discors)
- Mallard duck (Anas platyrhynchos)
- Lesser scaup (Aythya affinis)
- Ring necked duck (Aythya collaris)
- Canvasback (Aythya valisineria)
- Muscovy duck (Cairina moschata)
- Trumpeter swan (Cygnus buccinator)
- Mute swan (Cygnus olor)
- Black-bellied whistling duck (Dendrocygna autumnalis)
- Common merganser (Mergus merganser)

Order Charadriiformes

Family Laridae

- Swallow tailed gull (Creagrus furcatus)
- Caspian gull (Larus cachinnans)

Order Ciconiiformes

Family Ciconiidae

- Wood stork (Mycteria americana)

Order Columbiformes

Family Columbidae

- Speckled pigeon (Columba guinea)
- Japanese wood pigeon (Columba janthina)
- Rock pigeon (Columba livia)
- Common wood pigeon (Columba palumbus)
- Socorro common ground dove (Columbina passerina socorroensis)
- Ruddy ground dove (Columbina talpacoti)
- Tambourine dove (Turtur timpanistria)
- Scaled dove (Scardafella squammata)
- European turtle dove (Streptopelia turtur)
- Laughing dove (Stigmatopelia senegalensis)
- White-winged dove (Zenaida asiatica)
- Eared dove (Zenaida auriculata)
- Galápagos Dove (Zenaida galapagoensis)
- Mourning dove (Zenaida macroura)

Order Coraciiformes

Family Alcedinidae

- African pygmy kingfisher (Ispidina picta)

Family Brachypteraciidae

- Rufous headed ground roller (Atelornis crossleyi)
- Pitta like ground roller (Atelornis pittoides)

Family Bucerotidae

- Red-billed hornbill (Tockus erythrorhynchus)

Family Meropidae

- Blue checked bee-eater (Merops superciliosus)

Order Falconiformes

Family Falconidae

- Saker falcon (Falco cherrug)
- Lesser kestrel (Falco naumanni)
- American kestrel (Falco sparverius)
- Common kestrel (Falco tinnunculus)
- Chimango caracara (Milvago chimango)

Order Galliformes

Family Numididae

- Helmeted guineafowl (Numida meleagris)

Family Odontophoridae

- California quail (Callipepla californica)
- Scaled quail (Callipepla squamata)
- Bobwhite quail (Colinus virginianus)

Family Phasianidae

- Red legged partridge (Alectoris rufa)
- Chinese bamboo partridge (Bambusicola thoracicus)
- Ahanta francolin (Francolinus ahantensis)
- Swainson's francolin (Francolinus swainsonii)
- Chicken (Gallus gallus)
- Willow grouse (Lagopus lagopus)
- Wild turkey (Meleagris gallopavo)

Family Tetraonidae

- Dusky grouse (Dendragapus obscurus

Order Gruiformes

Family Gruidae

- Black crowned crane (Balearica pavonina)
- Sandhill crane (Grus canadensis)

Family Otidae

- MacQueen's bustard (Chlamydotis macqueenii)
- Red crested bustard (Eupodotis ruficrista)
- Great bustard (Otis tarda)

Order Passeriformes

Family Acrocephalidae

- Great reed warbler (Acrocephalus arundinaceus)
- Blyth's reed warbler (Acrocephalus dumetorum)
- Marsh warbler (Acrocephalus palustris)
- Sedge warbler (Acrocephalus schoenobaenus)
- Reed warbler (Acrocephalus scirpaceus)
- Clamorous reed warbler (Acrocephalus stentoreus)

Family Corvidae

- Blue jay (Cyanocitta cristata)
- Green jay (Cyanocorax yncas)

Family Dicruridae

- Fork-tailed drongo (Dicrurus adsimilis)
- Crested drongo (Dicrurus forficatus)

Family Emberizidae

- Dark eyed junco (Junco hyemalis)
- Rufous winged sparrow (Peucaea carpalis)
- White crowned sparrow (Zonotrichia leucophrys)

Family Estrildidae

- Red munia (Amandava amandava)
- Indian silverbill (Euodice malabarica)
- Tricoloured munia (Lonchura malacca)
- Scaly breasted munia (Lonchura punctulata)

Family Fringillidae

- House finch (Carpodacus mexicanus)
- Hawfinch (Coccothraustes coccothraustes)
- Chaffinch (Fringilla coelebs)

Family Hirundinidae

- Purple martin (Progne subis)

Family Icteridae

- Crested oropendola (Psarocolius decumanus)
- Montezuma oropendola (Psarocolius montezuma)

Family Laniidae

- Red backed shrike (Lanius collurio)
- Long tailed shrike (Lanius schach)
- Woodchat shrike (Lanius senator)

Family Meliphagidae

- New Holland honeyeaters (Phylidonyris novaehollandiae)

Family Mimidae

- Gray catbird (Dumetella carolinensis)

Family Motacillidae

- Yellow wagtail (Motacilla flava)

Family Muscicapidae

- White rumped shama (Copsychus malabaricus)
- Oriental magpie robin (Copsychus saularis)

Family Nectariniidae

- Black throated sunbird (Aethopyga saturata)
- Olive sunbird (Cyanomitra olivacea)

Family Oriolidae

- Golden oriole (Oriolus oriolus)

Family Paridae

- Blue tit (Cyanistes caeruleus)

Family Paradisaeidae

- Magnificent bird of paradise (Cicinnurus magnificus)
- Superb bird of paradise (Lophorina superba)

Family Parulidae

- American redstart (Setophaga ruticilla)

Family Passeridae

- House sparrow (Passer domesticus)

Family Ploceidae

- Red headed malimbe (Malimbus rubricollis)
- Streaked weaver (Ploceus manyar)
- Black-headed weaver (Ploceus melanocephalus)
- Baya weaver (Ploceus philippinus)
- Red billed quelea (Quelea quelea)

Family Pycnonotidae

- Yellow whiskered bulbul (Andropadus latirostris)
- Red whiskered bulbul (Pycnonotus jocosus)

Family Sturnidae

- Common myna (Acridotheres tristis)
- Common hill myna (Gracula religiosa)
- Chestnut tailed starling (Sturnia malabarica)
- Asian pied starling (Sturnus contra)
- Greater blue eared glossy starling (Lamprotornis chalybaeus)

Family Sylviidae

- Blackcap (Sylvia atricapilla)

Family Thraupidae

- Bananaquit (Coereba flaveola)
- Red capped cardinal (Paroaria gularis)
- Blue necked tanager (Tangara cyanicollis)
- Turquoise tanager (Tangara mexicana)

Family Timaliidae

- Rufous sibia (Heterophasia capistrata)
- Jungle babbler (Turdoides striata)

Family Turdidae

- Swainson's thrush (Catharus ustulatus)

Family Vangidae

- Hook billed vanga (Vanga curvirostris)

Family Zosteropidae

- Oriental white eye (Zosterops palpebrosus)

Order Pelecaniformes

Family Fregatidae

- Magnificent frigatebird (Fregata magnificens)
- Great frigatebird (Fregata minor)

Family Threskiornithidae

- African sacred ibis (Threskiornis aethiopicus)
- Glossy ibis (Plegadis falcinellus)

Order Piciformes

Family Megalaimidae

- Coppersmith barbet (Megalaima haemacephala)

Family Picidae

- Red bellied woodpecker (Melanerpes carolinus)
- Red cockaded woodpecker (Picoides borealis)
- Grey faced woodpecker (Picus canus)
- Greater yellownape (Picus flavinucha)

Order Phoenicopteriformes

Family Phoenicopteridae

- Lesser flamingo (Phoenicopterus minor)

Order Psittaciformes

Family Cacatuidae

- White cockatoo (Cacatua alba)
- Sulphur crested cockatoo (Cacatua galerita)
- Yellow crested cockatoo (Cacatua sulphurea)

Family Psittacidae

- Plum headed parakeet (Psittacula cyanocephala)
- Rose ringed parakeet (Psittacula krameri)
- Blossom headed parakeet (Psittacula roseata)
- African grey parrot (Psittacus erithacus)

Order Strigiformes

Family Strigidae

- Snowy owl (Bubo scandiacus)
- Brown Hawk-Owl (Ninox scutulata)
- European scops owl (Otus scops)
- Brown owl (Strix aluco)
- Spotted owl (Strix occidentalis)
- Spotted wood owl (Strix seloputo)

== Notes ==
Haemoproteus balazuci Dias 1953 is a junior synonym of H. testudinalis

Haemoproteus gymnorhidis de Mello 1936, Haemoproteus granulosum Rey Vila 1945, Haemoproteus danilewskyi var. urbanensis Sachs 1953 and Haemoproteus zasukhini Burtikashvili 1973 are considered to be synonyms of H. passeris Kruse 1890.

Haemoproteus rouxi Novy and MacNeal 1904 is a nomen nudum.
