= Haemoproteus meropis =

Scientific classification
- Domain: Eukaryota
- Clade: Sar
- Clade: Alveolata
- Phylum: Apicomplexa
- Class: Aconoidasida
- Order: Chromatorida
- Family: Haemoproteidae
- Genus: Haemoproteus
- Species: H. meropis

Binomial name
- Haemoproteus meropis (Zagar, 1945) emend. Bennett, 1978

Species of single-celled organism

Haemoproteus columbae is a species of parasitic eukaryote that infects bee-eaters.
