= Haemoproteus parabelopolskyi =

Scientific classification
- Domain: Eukaryota
- Clade: Diaphoretickes
- Clade: SAR
- Clade: Alveolata
- Phylum: Apicomplexa
- Class: Aconoidasida
- Order: Chromatorida
- Family: Haemoproteidae
- Genus: Haemoproteus
- Species: H. parabelopolskyi

Binomial name
- Haemoproteus parabelopolskyi Kruse, 1890

Species of single-celled organism

Haemoproteus parabelopolskyi is a species of parasitic alveolates that infects birds.

Seventeen strains of H. parabelopolskyi are found only in the blackcap, and form a monophyletic group; three further members of that group are found only in the garden warbler, and another three occur in the African hill babbler, supporting the shared ancestry of the three bird species.
