= Haemoproteus concavocentralis =

Scientific classification
- Domain: Eukaryota
- Clade: Diaphoretickes
- Clade: SAR
- Clade: Alveolata
- Phylum: Apicomplexa
- Class: Aconoidasida
- Order: Chromatorida
- Family: Haemoproteidae
- Genus: Haemoproteus
- Species: H. concavocentralis

Binomial name
- Haemoproteus concavocentralis Dimitrov et al., 2014

Species of single-celled organism

Haemoproteus concavocentralis is a parasite first found in the hawfinch (Coccothraustes coccothraustes) in Bulgaria. The species can be distinguished from other avian haemoproteids due to an unfilled concave space between the central part of its advanced gametocytes and erythrocyte nucleus.
