= Haemoproteus plataleae =

Scientific classification
- Domain: Eukaryota
- Clade: Diaphoretickes
- Clade: SAR
- Clade: Alveolata
- Phylum: Apicomplexa
- Class: Aconoidasida
- Order: Chromatorida
- Family: Haemoproteidae
- Genus: Haemoproteus
- Species: H. plataleae

Binomial name
- Haemoproteus plataleae de Mello, 1935

Species of single-celled organism

Haemoproteus plataleae is a species of parasitic alveolate eukaryotes that infects ibises and spoonbills. It has been recovered from adult and juvenile American white ibises in Florida.
