= Haemoproteus columbae =

Scientific classification
- Domain: Eukaryota
- Clade: Sar
- Clade: Alveolata
- Phylum: Apicomplexa
- Class: Aconoidasida
- Order: Chromatorida
- Family: Haemoproteidae
- Genus: Haemoproteus
- Species: H. columbae

Binomial name
- Haemoproteus columbae Kruse, 1890

Species of blood parasite

Haemoproteus columbae is a species of blood parasite related to Plasmodium and other malaria parasites.

== Phylogenetic relationships among the Haemosporidia ==
Haemoproteus columbae is a true member of the genus Haemoproteus, basal to other avian Parahaemoproteus species. Parahaemoproteus species have been subsequently split from Haemoproteus and are recognized as their own genus, sister to Plasmodium malaria parasites.

== Transmission ==
Haemoproteus columbae is transmitted by the pigeon louse fly, Pseudolynchia canariensis.

== Pathology or host effects of infection with H. columbae ==
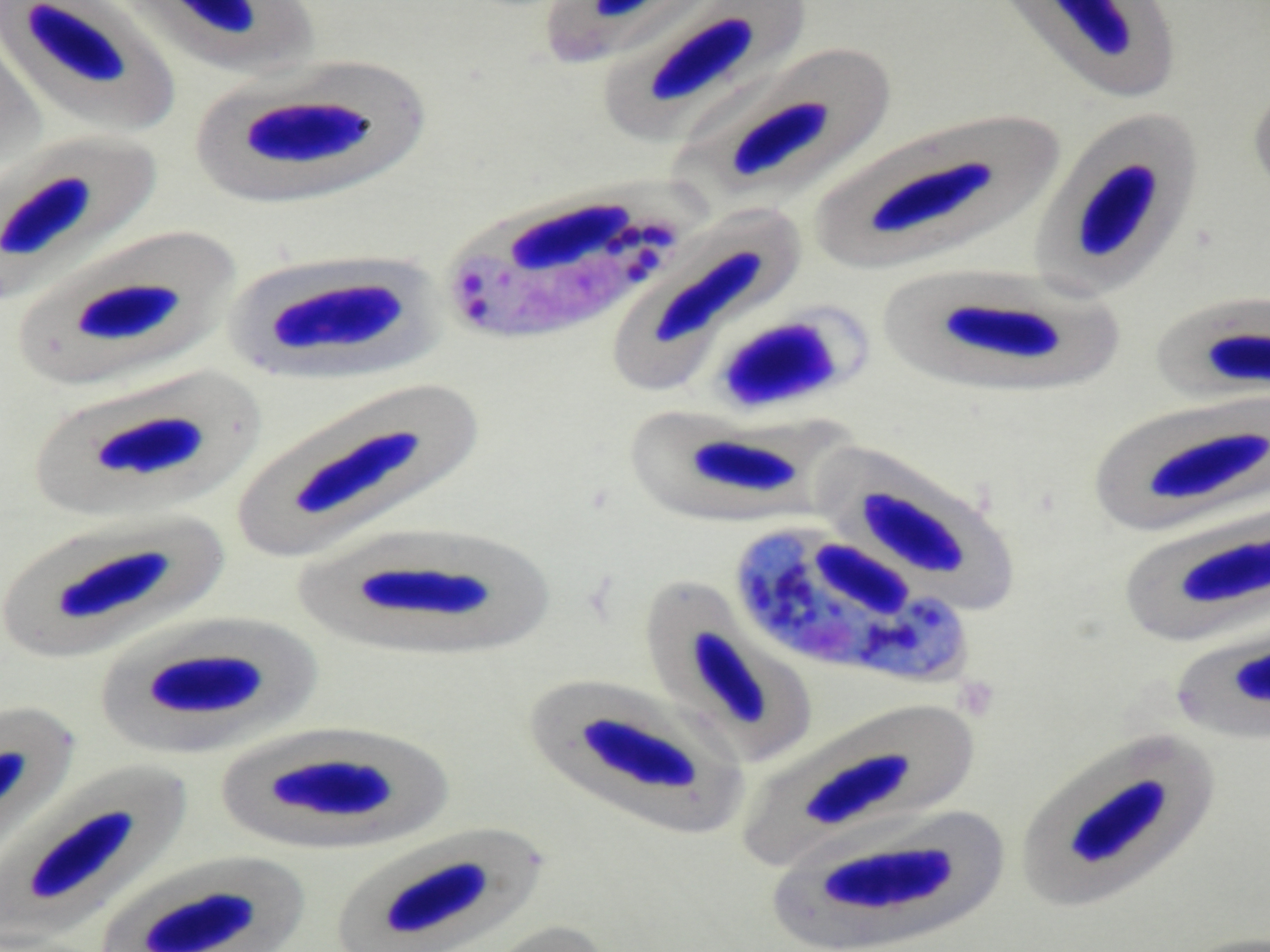
Male (upper left, more pink) and female (lower right, more blue) H. columbae parasites in Rock Pigeon nucleated red blood cells.

Haemoproteus columbae infects pigeons. It is usually benign and does not reduce survival of its host. However, it can sometimes be fatal to young pigeons.

It is slated for genome sequencing.
