= Haemoproteus coatneyi =

Scientific classification
- Domain: Eukaryota
- Clade: Sar
- Clade: Alveolata
- Phylum: Apicomplexa
- Class: Aconoidasida
- Order: Chromatorida
- Family: Haemoproteidae
- Genus: Haemoproteus
- Species: H. coatneyi

Binomial name
- Haemoproteus coatneyi Burry-Caines & Bennett, 1992

Species of single-celled organism

Haemoproteus coatneyi is a species of parasitic eukaryote that is found in the yellowhammer. Male yellowhammers with high levels of this parasite produced fewer offspring (there was no such effect for females), and tend to be less brightly coloured. The striking plumage of the male yellowhammer may therefore have arisen as a signal of fitness to breed. Yellowhammers infected with Haemoproteus species may have lower winter survival rates due to a tendency to having shorter wings.
