= Haemoproteus homovelans =

Scientific classification
- Domain: Eukaryota
- Clade: Diaphoretickes
- Clade: SAR
- Clade: Alveolata
- Phylum: Apicomplexa
- Class: Aconoidasida
- Order: Chromatorida
- Family: Haemoproteidae
- Genus: Haemoproteus
- Species: H. homovelans

Binomial name
- Haemoproteus homovelans Dimitrov et al., 2014

Synonyms
- Haemoproteus (Parahaemoproteus) homovelans

Species of single-celled organism

Haemoproteus homovelans is a parasite first found in the Grey-faced Woodpecker, Picus canus, in Bulgaria. Haemoproteus homovelans has circumnuclear gametocytes that lack volutin granules. The species is similar to Haemoproteus velans, yet the latter's gametocytes are overfilled with volutin.
