= Haemoproteus vacuolatus =

Scientific classification
- Domain: Eukaryota
- Clade: Diaphoretickes
- Clade: SAR
- Clade: Alveolata
- Phylum: Apicomplexa
- Class: Aconoidasida
- Order: Chromatorida
- Family: Haemoproteidae
- Genus: Haemoproteus
- Species: H. vacuolatus

Binomial name
- Haemoproteus vacuolatus Valkiūnas, Iezhova, Loiseau, Chasar, Smith, & Sehgal, 2008

Species of single-celled organism

Haemoproteus vacuolatus is a parasite. It was found in Andropadus latirostris in Ghana and Cameroon.
