= Haemocystidium =

Scientific classification
- Domain: Eukaryota
- Clade: Sar
- Clade: Alveolata
- Phylum: Apicomplexa
- Class: Aconoidasida
- Order: Chromatorida
- Family: Haemoproteidae
- Genus: Haemocystidium; Castellani and Willey, 1904

Species
- Haemocystidium apigmentada; Haemocystidium kopki; Haemocystidium lygodactyli; Haemocystidium papernae; Haemocystidium ptyodactyli; Haemocystidium quettaensis

Genus of single-celled organisms

Haemocystidium is a genus of parasitic alveolates belonging to the phylum Apicomplexa.

== History ==
The genus Haemocystidium was created to give a name to the haemoproteid of a gecko belonging to the genus Hemidactylus in Sri Lanka by Castellani and Willey in 1904. A second species in this genus was described in 1909 by Johnston and Cleland who found pigmented gametocytes in the blood of the Australian tortoise Chelodina longicollis. These species were transferred to Haemoproteus in 1926 by Wenyon.

The genus was resurrected by Garnham in 1966 when he created a new generic name - Simondia - for the haemoproteids of chelonians. He followed the opinions of Wenyon, Hewitt and DeGiusti and suggested that all these parasites belonged to the one species - Simondia metchnikovi. He retained the name Haemocystidium for the haemoproteids of lizards.

Levine and Campbell in 1971 moved all the species in Simondia and Haemocystidium into Haemoproteus an opinion that was followed by subsequent authors.

The genus Haemocystidium was resurrected again by Telford in 1996 when he described three new species of protozoa in geckos from Pakistan.

The haemosporidians found in reptiles have been classified into several families; Haemoproteidae, genera Haemoproteus sp. and Haemocystidium

This genus like those of many protozoa may be further modified once additional DNA sequences are available.

== Description ==
Haemocystidium is distinguished from Plasmodium by the absence of an asexual cycle in circulating blood cells

It is distinguished from Haemoproteus by meronts that do not form as pseudocytomeres.
