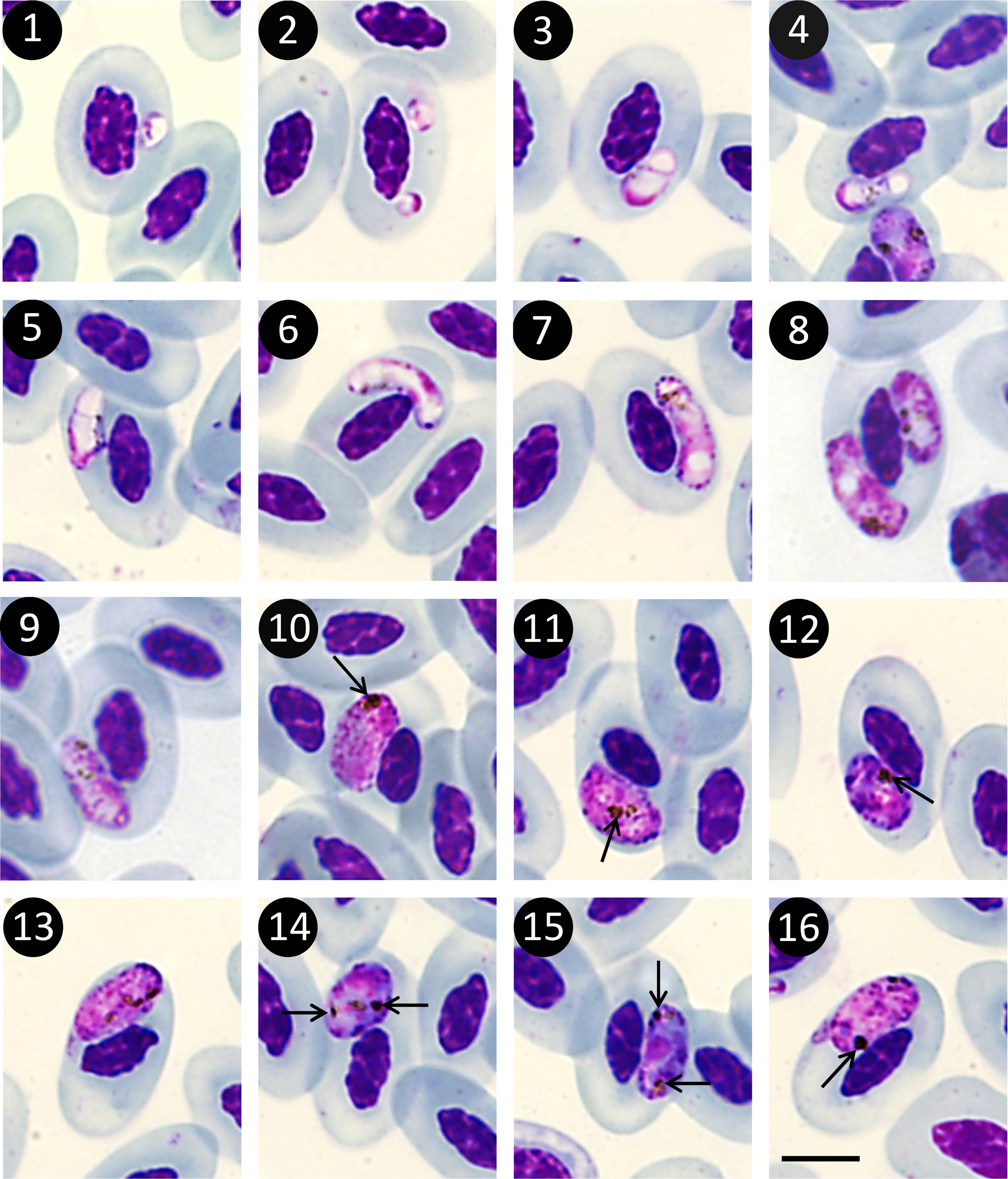
- Haemoproteus ilanpapernai (Haemoproteidae)

Scientific classification
- Domain: Eukaryota
- Clade: Diaphoretickes
- Clade: SAR
- Clade: Alveolata
- Phylum: Apicomplexa
- Class: Aconoidasida
- Order: Chromatorida
- Suborder: Laveraniina; Euzéby, 1988

Families
- Plasmodiidae; Haemoproteidae

= Laveraniina =

Suborder of single-celled organisms

Laveraniina is a suborder of parasitic alveolates in the phylum Apicomplexa. The taxon was erected in 1988 by Jacques Euzéby.
