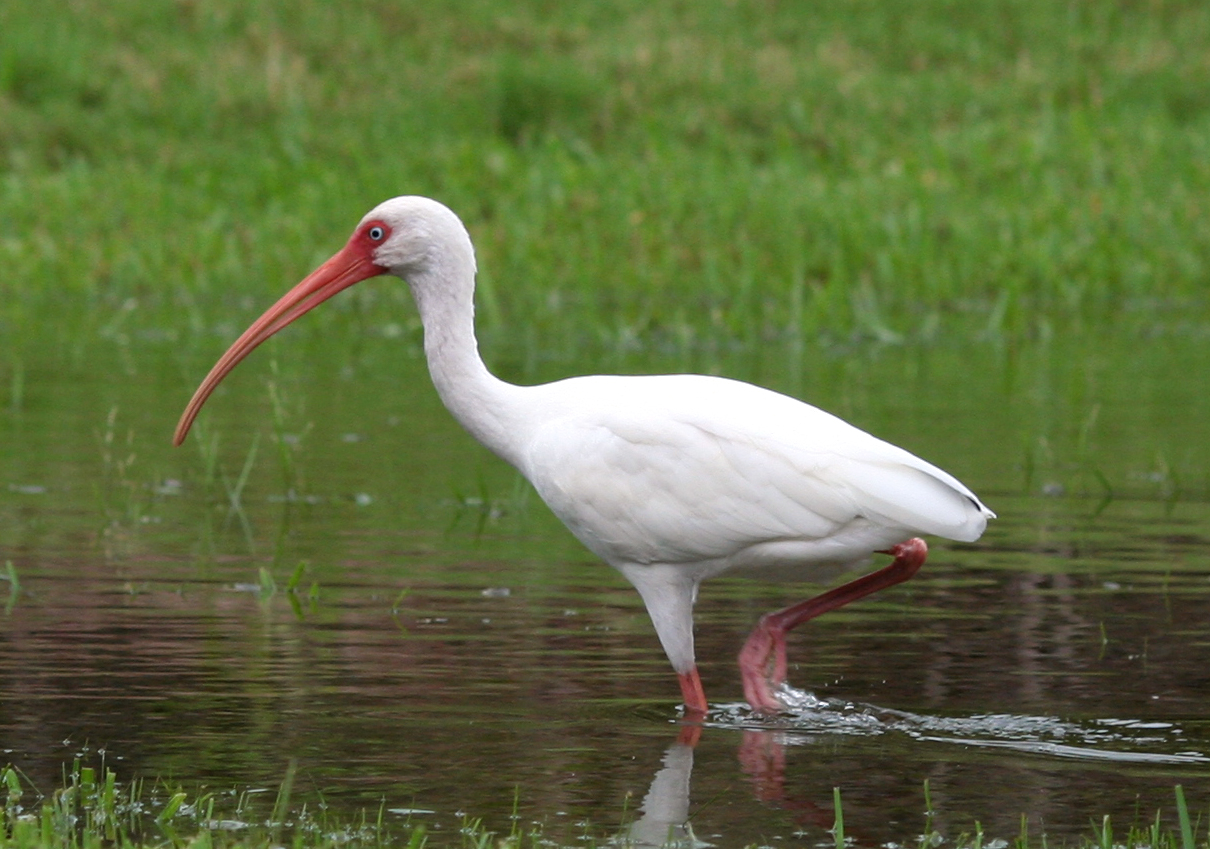
- An adult American white ibis wading in the Tampa Bay area of Florida
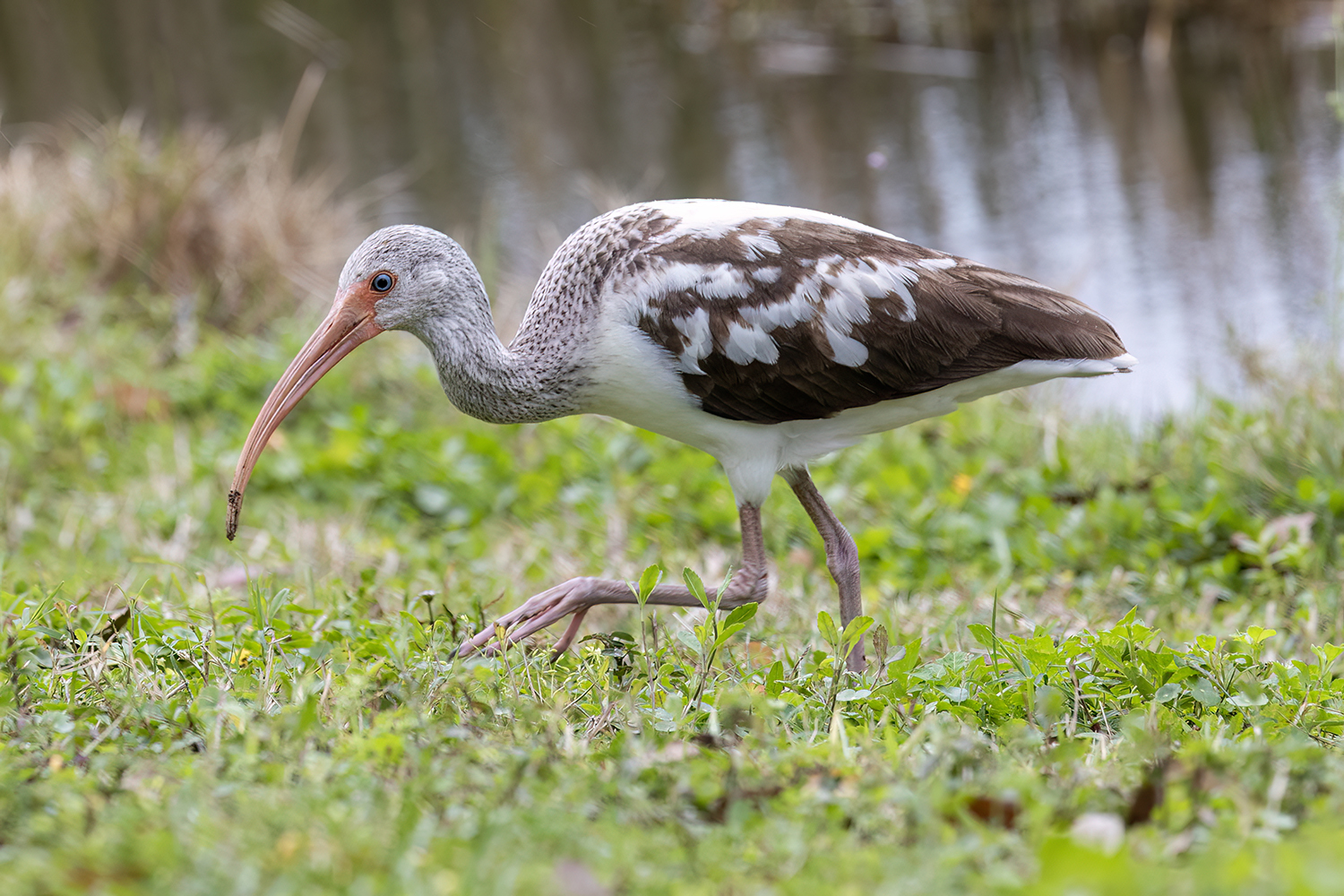
- Immature white ibis plumage

Conservation status
- Least Concern (IUCN 3.1)

Scientific classification
- Kingdom: Animalia
- Phylum: Chordata
- Class: Aves
- Order: Pelecaniformes
- Family: Threskiornithidae
- Genus: Eudocimus
- Species: E. albus

Binomial name
- Eudocimus albus (Linnaeus, 1758)
- Year-round Non-breeding Passage

Synonyms
- Scolopax alba Linnaeus, 1758; Scolopax fusca Linnaeus, 1758; Tantalus albus Linnaeus, 1766; Tantalus fuscus Linnaeus, 1766

= American white ibis =

American white ibis Temporal range: Late Pleistocene–Recent

Bird in the ibis family

The American white ibis (Eudocimus albus) is a species of bird in the ibis family, Threskiornithidae. It is found from the southern half of the US East Coast (from southern New Jersey to Georgia), along the Gulf Coast states (Florida, Alabama, Mississippi, Louisiana and Texas) and south through most of the Caribbean coastal regions of Central America. This particular ibis species is a medium-sized wading bird, possessing an overall white plumage with black wing-tips (usually only visible in flight), and having the typical downward-curving bill of the ibises, though of a bright red-orange color, the same hue as its long legs. Males are larger and have longer bills than females. The breeding range runs along the Gulf and Atlantic Coast, and the coasts of Mexico and Central America. Outside the breeding period, the range extends further inland in North America and also includes the Caribbean. It is also found along the northwestern South American coastline in Colombia and Venezuela. Populations in central Venezuela overlap and interbreed with the scarlet ibis. The two have been classified by some authorities as a single species.

Their diet consists primarily of small aquatic prey, such as insects and small fishes. Crayfish are its preferred food in most regions, but it can adjust its diet according to the habitat and prey abundance. Its main foraging behavior is probing with its beak at the bottom of shallow water to feel for and capture its prey. It does not see the prey.

During the breeding season, the American white ibis gathers in huge colonies near water. Pairs are predominantly monogamous and both parents care for the young, although males tend to engage in extra-pair copulation with other females to increase their reproductive success. Males have also been found to pirate food from unmated females and juveniles during the breeding season.

Human pollution has affected the behavior of the American white ibis via an increase in the concentrations of methylmercury, which is released into the environment from untreated waste. Exposure to methylmercury alters the hormone levels of American white ibis, affecting their mating and nesting behavior and leading to lower reproduction rates.

== Taxonomy ==
The American white ibis was one of the many bird species originally described by Carl Linnaeus in the 1758 10th edition of his Systema Naturae, where it was given the binomial name of Scolopax albus. The species name is the Latin adjective albus "white". Alternative common names that have been used include Spanish curlew and white curlew. English naturalist Mark Catesby mistook immature birds for a separate species, which he called the brown curlew. Local creole names in Louisiana include bec croche and petit flaman.

Johann Georg Wagler gave the species its current binomial name in 1832 when he erected the new genus Eudocimus, whose only other species is the scarlet ibis (E. ruber). There has long been debate on whether the two should be considered subspecies or closely related species, and the American Ornithologists' Union considers the two to be a superspecies as they are parapatric. The lack of observed hybrids was a large factor in the view that the species were separate.

However, in a field study published in 1987, researchers Cristina Ramo and Benjamin Busto found evidence of interbreeding in a population where the ranges of the scarlet and white ibises overlap along the coast and in the Llanos region of Colombia and Venezuela. They observed individuals of the two species mating and pairing, as well as hybrid ibises with pale orange plumage, or white plumage with occasional orange feathers; their proposal that these birds be classified as a single species, has been followed by least one field guide. Hybrid ibises have also been recorded in Florida, where the scarlet ibis has been introduced into wild populations of American white ibis. Birds of intermediate to red plumage have persisted for generations.

Ornithologists James Hancock and Jim Kushlan also consider the two to be a single species, with the differences in plumage, size, skin coloration and degree of bill darkening during breeding season forming the diagnostic characters. They have proposed the populations recontacted in northwestern South America after a period of separation, and that the color difference is likely due to the presence of an enzyme that allows uptake of pigment in the diet. They have questioned whether white-plumaged birds of South America are in fact part of the ruber rather than the albus taxon, and acknowledge that more investigation is needed to determine this.

American white ibis fossils have been reported from Late Pleistocene deposits on Great Abaco Island in the Bahamas.

== Description ==
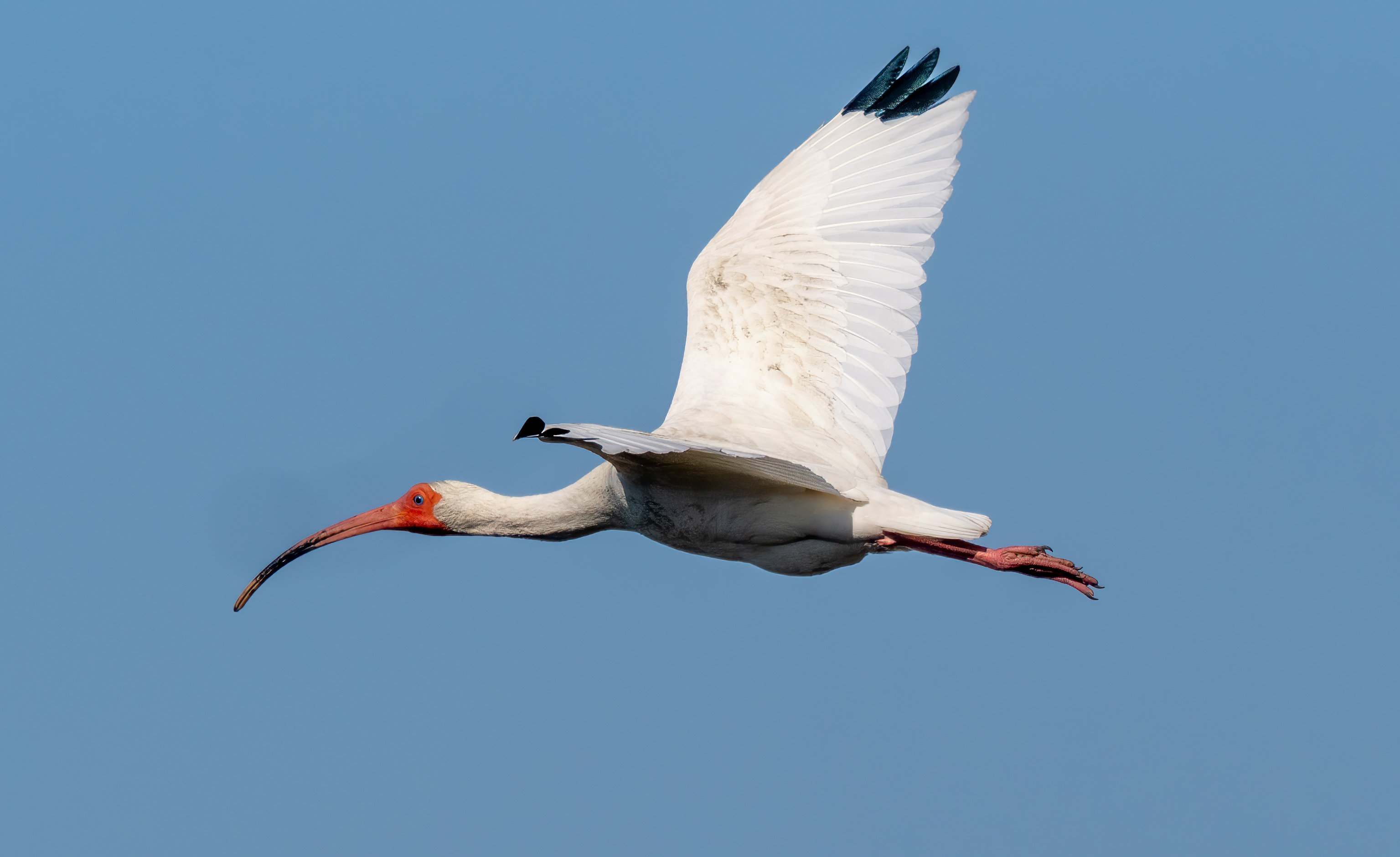
In flight in Ocean City, New Jersey

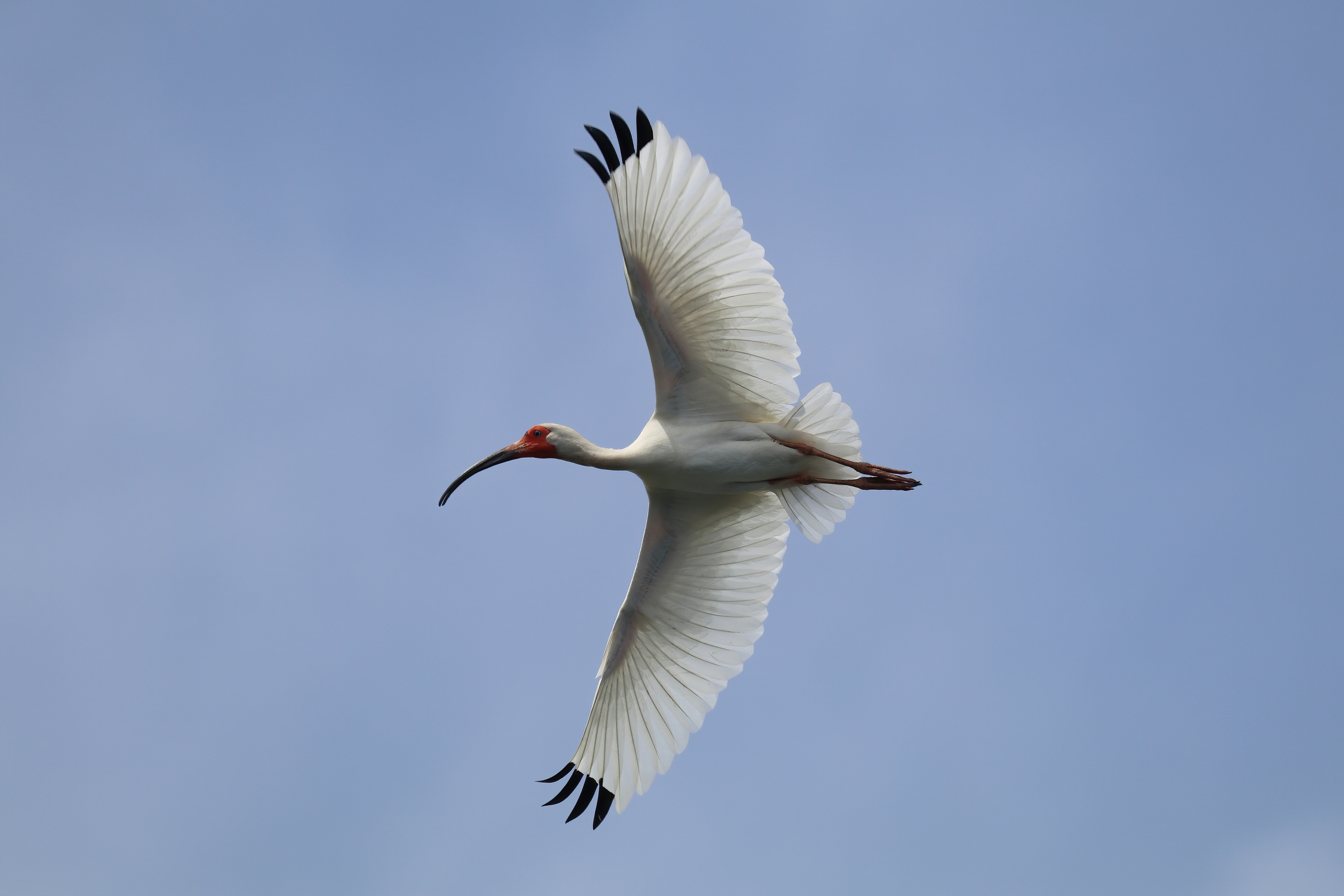
E. a. ramobustorum off Boca Chica, Chiriquí, Panama

The white plumage and pink facial skin of adult American white ibises are distinctive. Adults have black wingtips that are usually only visible in flight. In non-breeding condition the long downcurved bill and long legs are bright red-orange. During the first ten days of the breeding season, the skin darkens to a deep pink on the bill and an almost purple-tinted red on the legs. It then fades to a paler pink, and the tip of the bill becomes blackish. It is difficult to determine the sex of an adult American white ibis from its external appearance, since the sexes have similar plumage. However, there is sexual dimorphism in size and proportion as males are significantly larger and heavier than females and have longer and stouter bills. This species is moderately large for an ibis but is relatively short legged, compact and bulky for a large wading bird. A study of the American white ibis in southern Florida yielded weight ranges of 872.9 to 1,261 g (1.924 to 2.780 lb) for males and 592.7 to 861.3 g (1.307 to 1.899 lb) for females, with average weights of 1,036.4 g (2.285 lb) for males and 764.5 g (1.685 lb) for females. The length of adult female and male birds ranges from 53 to 70 cm (21 to 28 in) with a 90 to 105 cm (35 to 41 in) wingspan. Among standard measurements, American white ibis measure 20.5–31 cm (8.1–12.2 in) along each wing, have a tail measurement of 9.3–12.2 cm (3.7–4.8 in), a tarsus of 6.75–11.3 cm (2.66–4.45 in) and a culmen of 11–16.9 cm (4.3–6.7 in).

The newly hatched American white ibis is covered with violet down feathers, deepening to dark brown or black on the head and wings. The chest is often bare and there can be a white tuft on the head. The irises are brown. The exposed skin is pinkish initially, apart from the tip of the bill which is dark gray, but turns gray within a few days of hatching. The bill is short and straight at birth and has an egg tooth which falls off between days five and nine, and develops three black rings from around day six, before turning gray by around six weeks of age. The gray to sandy gray brown juvenile plumage appears between weeks two and six, and face and bill become pink a few weeks later, while the legs remain gray. The irises have turned slate-gray by this stage. Once fledged, the juvenile American white ibis has largely brown plumage and only the rump, underwing and underparts are white. The legs become light orange. As it matures, white feathers begin appearing on the back and it undergoes a gradual molt to obtain the white adult plumage. This is mostly complete by the end of the second year, although some brown feathers persist on the head and neck until the end of the third year. Juvenile birds take around two years to reach adult size and weight.

Like other species of ibis, the American white ibis flies with neck and legs outstretched, often in long loose lines or V formations—a 1986 field study in North Carolina noted over 80% of adult ibis doing so, while juveniles rapidly took up the practice over the course of the summer. The resulting improvement in aerodynamics may lower energy expenditure. These lines fly in an undulating pattern as they alternately flap and glide. Soaring in a circular pattern is also seen. Heights of 500 to 1,000 m (1,600 to 3,300 ft) may be reached as birds glide over flights of 20 km (12 mi) or more. More commonly, birds fly between 60 and 100 m (200 and 330 ft) above the ground, gliding or flapping at a rate of around 3.3 wingbeats a second.

The main call of the American white ibis is a honking sound, transcribed as urnk, urnk, or hunk, hunk. The call is used in flight, courtship or when disturbed. Birds also utter a muted huu-huu-huu call while foraging, and make a squealing call in courtship. Young in the nest give a high-pitched zziu as a begging call.

=== Similar species ===
Immature American white and scarlet ibises are very difficult to tell apart, although scarlet ibises tend to have darker legs and bare skin around the face. An immature American white ibis could be mistaken for an immature glossy ibis, but the latter is wholly dark brown and lacks the white belly and rump. The adult is distinguishable from the wood stork, which is much larger and its wings have more black on them.

== Distribution and habitat ==
An American white ibis at Riverside Park, Jacksonville, Florida

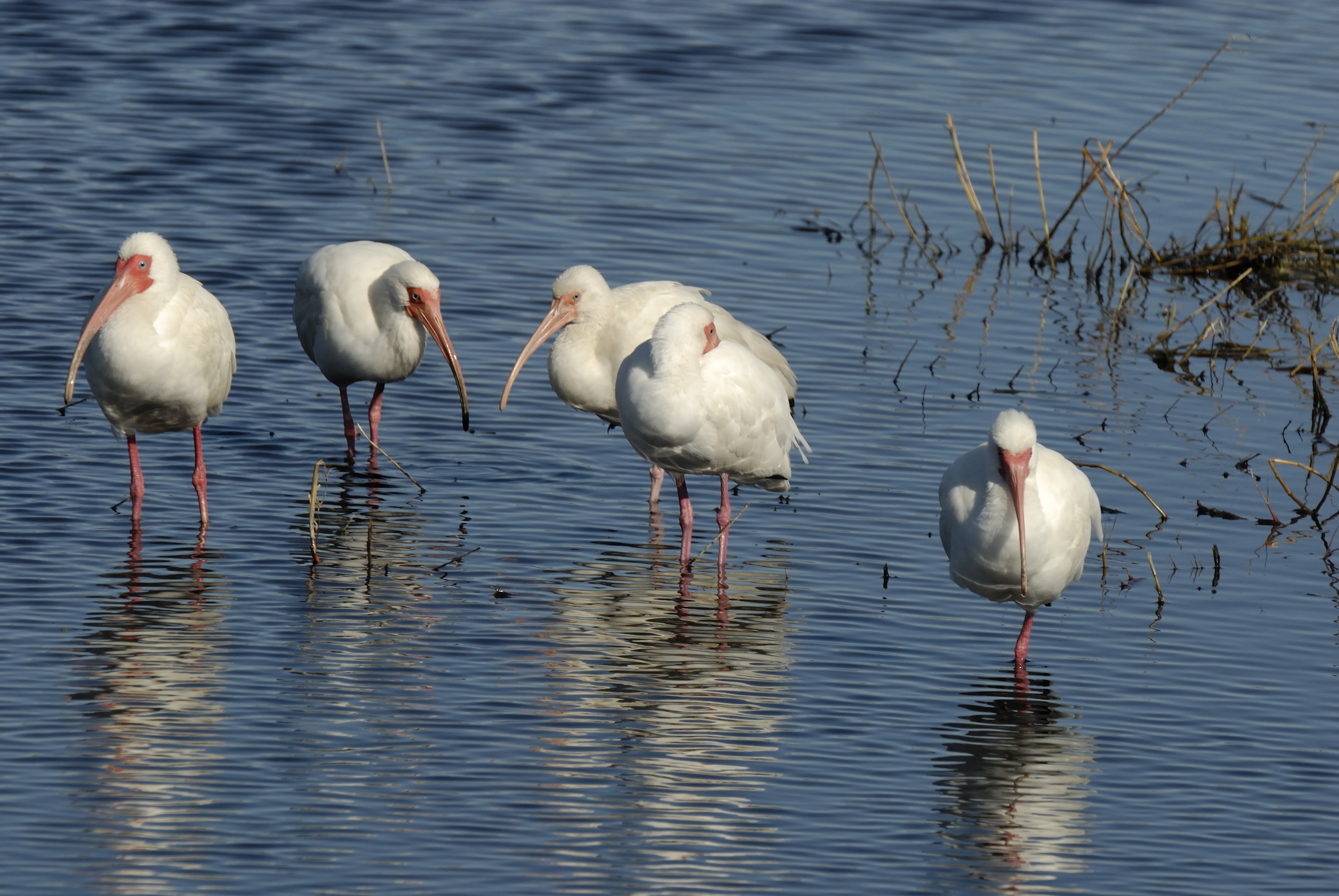
Adults in shallow water at Merritt Island National Wildlife Refuge near the Atlantic coast of Florida

The American white ibis is most common in Florida, where over 30,000 have been counted in a single breeding colony. It also occurs throughout the Caribbean, on both coasts of Mexico (from Baja California southwards) and Central America, and as far south as Colombia and Venezuela. The non-breeding range extends further inland, reaching north to Virginia, and west to eastern Texas.

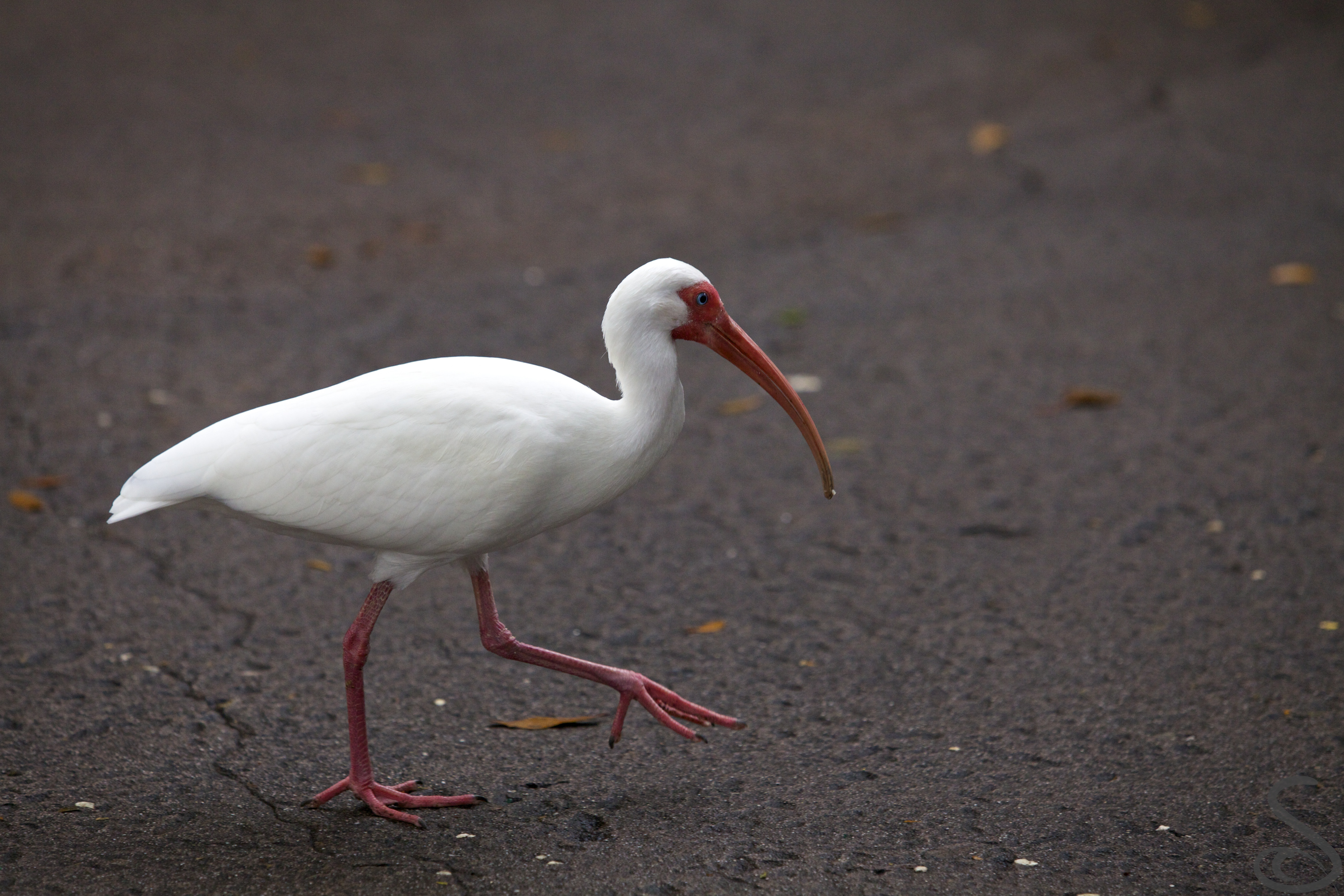
Adult American white ibis on pavement outside of Orlando, Florida

The species is known to wander, and has been sighted, sometimes in small flocks, in states far out of its usual range.

In North America, breeding takes place along the Atlantic coast, from southern New Jersey south to Florida and thence west along the Gulf Coast. (It nested in New Jersey for the first time in 2020, having appeared there rarely before then.) Laguna Cuyutlán is an isolated and regionally important wetland in the state of Colima on México's west coast where a breeding colony has been recorded. American white ibises are not faithful to the sites where they breed, and large breeding colonies composed of ten thousand birds or more can congregate and disband in one or two breeding seasons. Breeding populations across its range have fluctuated greatly with wholesale movement between states.

Until the 1940s, the species bred only in large numbers in Florida, mostly within the Everglades. Drought conditions elsewhere in the United States led to more than 400,000 American white ibis breeding there in the 1930s. In the 1950s and 1960s, large colonies appeared in Alabama, Louisiana, and then North and South Carolina and the Gulf Coast of Florida, and finally Texas in the 1970s. Between the 1970s and early 1990s, breeding colonies declined and disappeared in South Carolina and Florida, and greatly increased in North Carolina and Louisiana. Colonies last between one and seventeen years, their longevity related to size and quality of nearby wetlands. The longest-lasting are associated with wetlands over 800 km^{2} (310 sq mi) in size. Degradation of wetland or breeding sites are reasons for abandonment. The population of American white ibises in a colony at Pumpkinseed Island in Georgetown County, South Carolina, dropped from 10,000 to zero between 1989 and 1990 as Hurricane Hugo had inundated nearby freshwater foraging areas with salt water.

The American white ibis is found in a variety of habitats, although shallow coastal marshes, wetlands and mangrove swamps are preferred. It is also commonly found in muddy pools, on mudflats and even wet lawns. Populations that are away from the coast and shoreline, particularly in southern Florida, often reside in other forms of wetlands such as marshes, ponds and flooded fields. In summer, these move to more coastal and estuarine habitats as inland waterways become flooded with summer rains and the ibis find the water levels too deep to forage effectively.

=== Fossil record ===
Remains similar to the American white ibis have been found in Middle Pliocene deposits of the Bone Valley formation in central Florida, and Lower Pliocene deposits of the Yorktown Formation at Lee Creek in North Carolina. Two species, one living and one extinct, have been recovered from the Talara Tar Seeps in northern coastal Peru. Eudocimus peruvianus was described from a tarsometatarsus that differed slightly from E. albus, whose remains were also found there. Remains of neither species are common in the beds. The tar seeps have been dated at 13,900 years old. The American white ibis is still found in Peru.

== Behavior ==
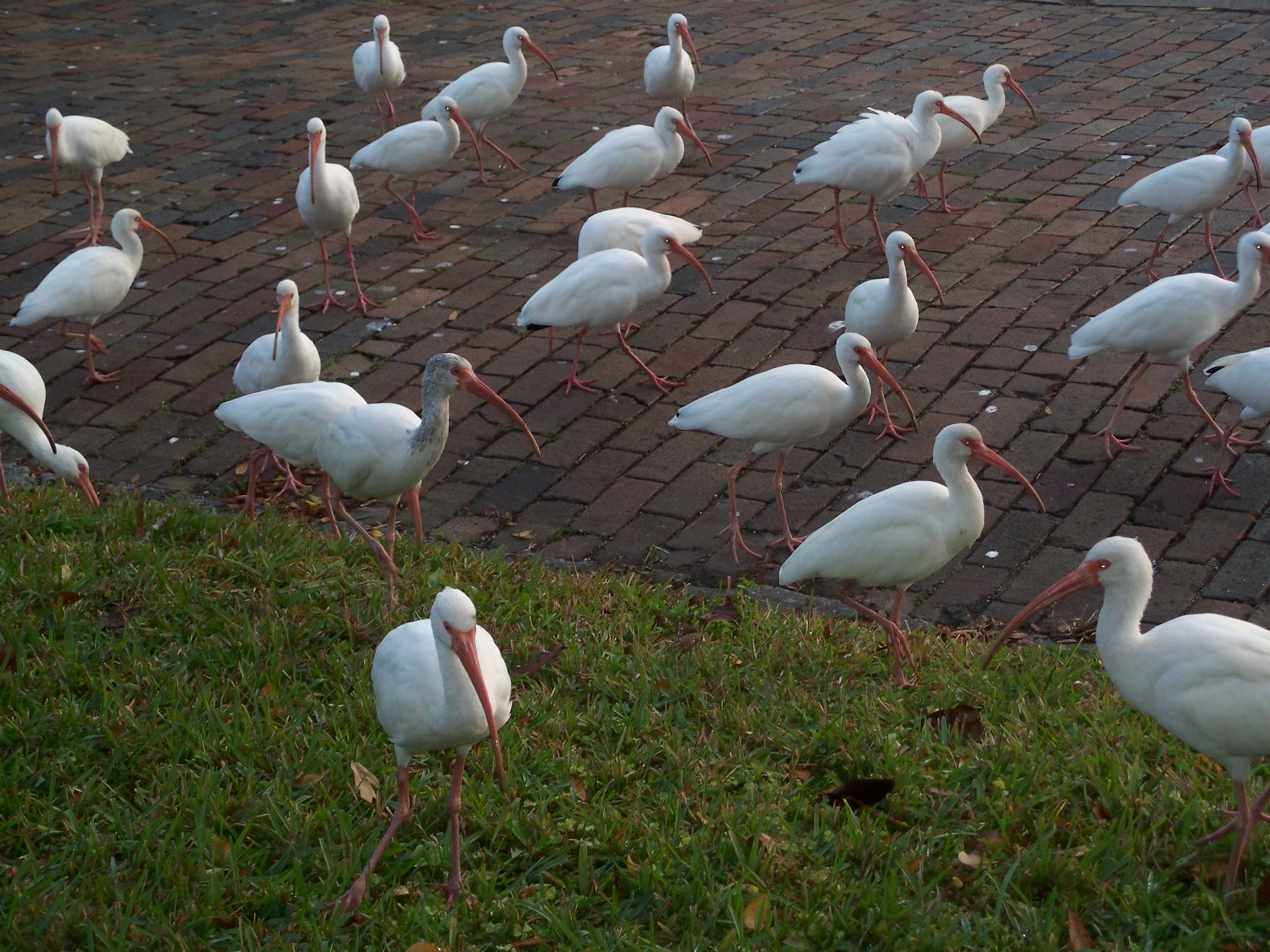
American white Ibis birds in Dade City, Florida

A field study late in the Florida nesting season revealed that on an average day, adult American white ibis spent 10.25 hours looking for food, 0.75 hours flying, 13 hours resting, roosting, and attending to their nests. Much of the time roosting is spent preening, biting and working their feathers with their long bills, as well as rubbing the oil glands on the sides of their heads on back plumage. American white ibis generally only preen themselves, not engaging in allopreening unless part of courtship behavior. Bathing often takes place before preening; ibis squat in water 5–20 cm (2.0–7.9 in) deep and flick water over themselves with each wing in succession. Hundreds of birds may bathe together around the time of courtship.

The American white ibis is territorial, defending the nesting and display sites against intruders. Agonistic or threat displays include lunging forward with the bill in a horizontal posture, and standing upright and snapping the bill opposite another bird engaging in the same display. Birds also lunge and bite, often holding onto an opponent's head or wings.

=== Breeding and lifespan ===
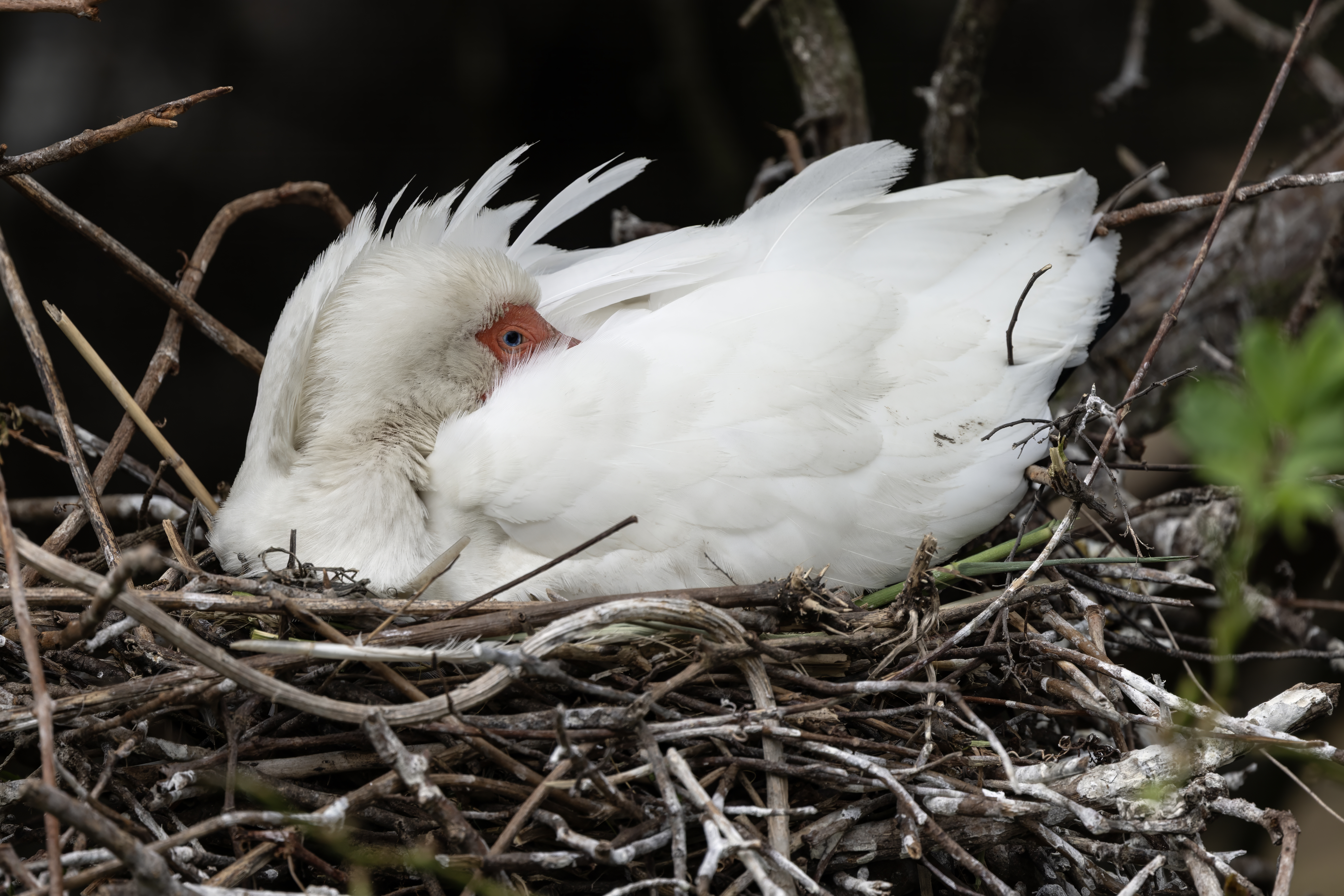
A White Ibis on a nest in New Jersey

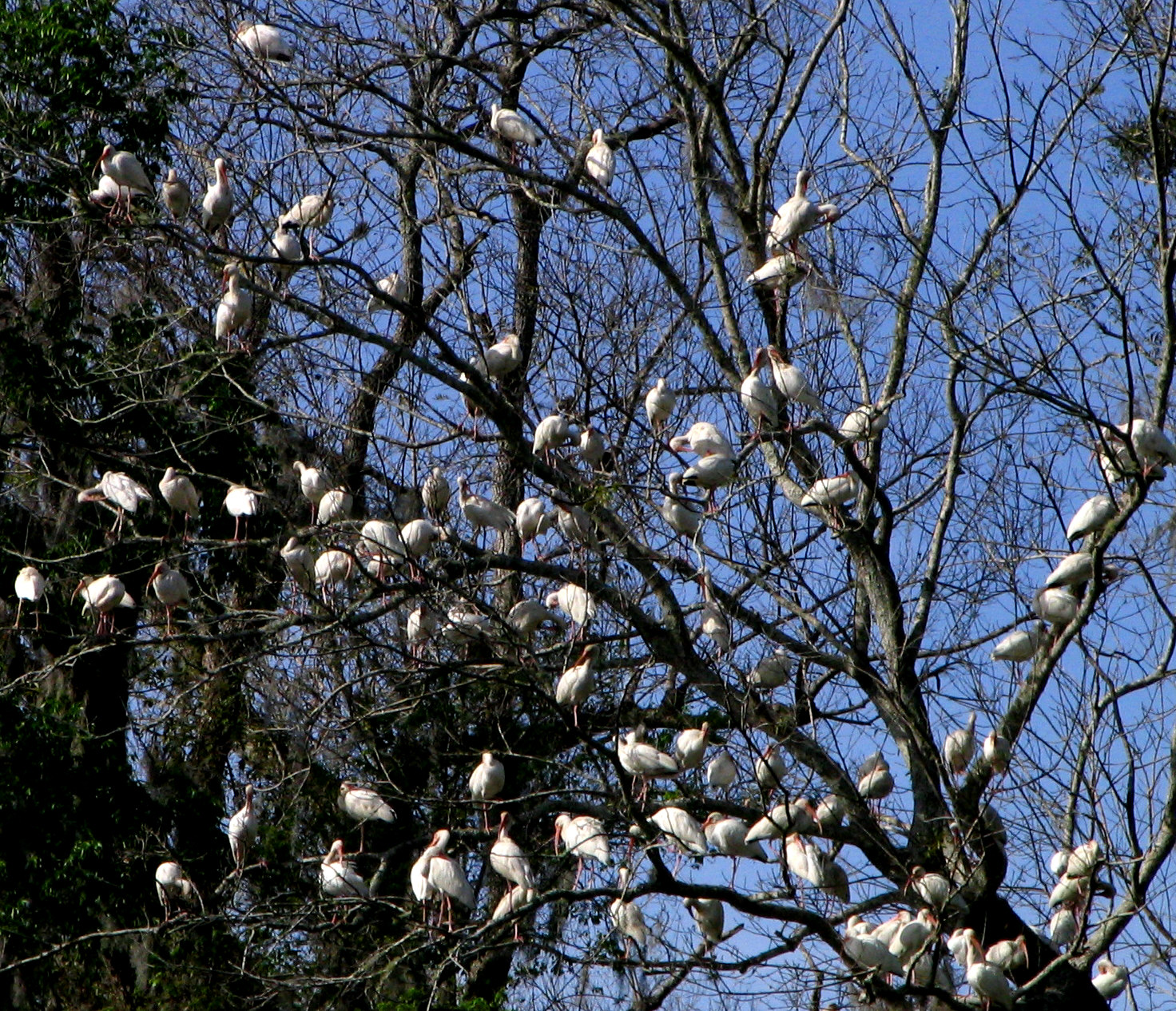
Birds roosting in a tree near St. Johns River, Florida

The American white ibis pairs up in spring and breeds in huge colonies, often with other waterbird species. Nesting begins as soon as suitable foraging and nesting habitat is available. The female selects the site, usually in the branches of a tree or shrub, which is often over water, and builds the nest, and males assist by bringing nest material. Anywhere from one to five eggs are typically laid, with two or three being the most common. The eggs are matte pale blue-green in color with brown splotches, measure 5.8 cm × 3.9 cm (2.3 in × 1.5 in), and weigh on average 50.8 g (1.79 oz). Clutch sizes are usually lower in coastal colonies as compared to inland colonies, although there are no statistically significant differences in the fledging rate of both colonies. Throughout the mating and incubation period, the male undergoes a period of starvation to stay close to the nest and aggressively defend his nest and mate from both predators and other ibises in preference to foraging for food. In the 2006 breeding season, a non-breeding adult female was observed to be tending to multiple nests that belonged to other American white ibises—the first time the behavior has been documented for this species.

Although the American white ibis is predominantly monogamous and both sexes provide parental care to their young, the male often flies off to engage in extra-pair copulation with other nesting females after mating with its primary female partner. These extra-pair copulations are usually done after the within-pair copulations, and make up about 45% of all total matings, although only about 15% of all extra-pair copulations are successful. By not restricting the number of females it copulates with, the male is able to increase its reproductive success considerably. Although females are receptive towards extra-pair copulations, male mate-guarding greatly reduces the rate of successful female involvement in attempted extra-pair copulations by other males.

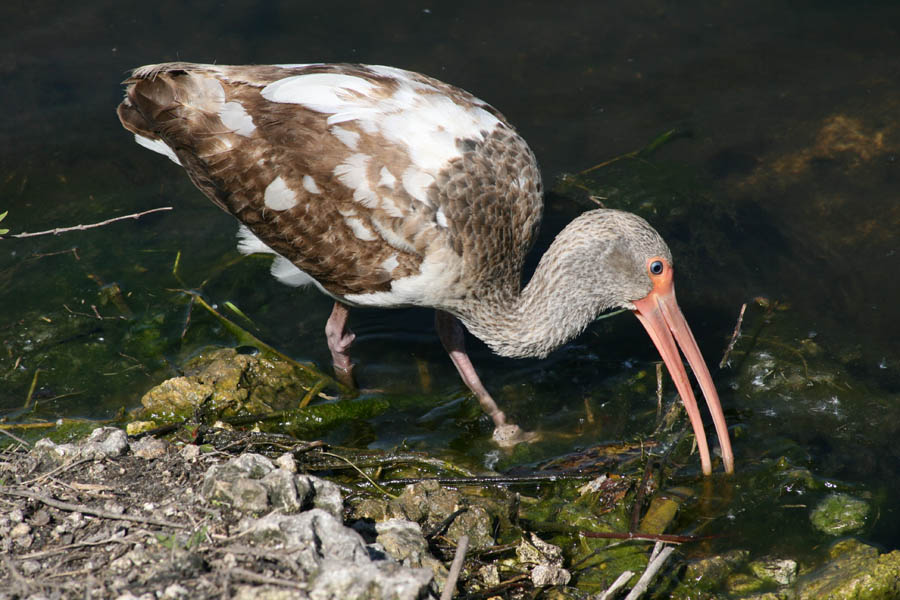
Juvenile in Everglades National Park. Some of its brown feathers have molted and have been replaced with white feathers.

The breeding success of the American white ibis is sensitive to the hydrological conditions of the ecosystem such as rainfall and water levels. Low and decreasing water levels predict good prey accessibility. Water level reversals, where levels rise in the breeding season, disperse prey and impact on foraging success. Nest numbers and average clutch sizes are smaller in periods of reduced prey availability. The success rate of parents raising one or more young to 20 days of age ranges widely from 5 to 70% of nests, and varies greatly between nearby colonies. American white ibis parents have been known to supplement their chicks' diet with items such as cockroaches and rotting food from human garbage in poorer years, when fish and crayfish are more scarce. Studies have also shown that years with higher nesting numbers had significantly faster spring drying rates of water bodies than years with low nesting numbers. This is because faster drying rates means that there are fewer fish and increased available area where crayfish can be hunted. This highlights the fact that American white ibises do not use probability of nesting failure as a key factor in determining nesting sites but instead, rely on other criteria such as prey availability and nest-site predation rates. The draining of wetlands in south Florida has also impacted on species that forage in shallow water such as the American white ibis, and its increase in numbers is a key indicator of restoration of habitat within the Everglades.

The main cause of nest failure among the species is due to nest abandonment, the leading cause of which is inundation from extremely high tides. Parents abandoned 61% of all nesting starts either during or immediately after extremely high tides. The eggs float out of the flooded nests, or get washed out into the sea by wave action. Incubating parents usually abandon the nest when the water or tidal levels reaches 3 to 8 cm (1.2 to 3.1 in) above the bottom of the nest cup. Nevertheless, there have been instances where the parents have been observed to transport their eggs to another nest in an attempt to salvage some eggs. However, despite the fact that some nesting sites face high chance of tidal damage every breeding season, American white ibises still continue to nest in these areas because of other favorable conditions such as abundant nearby food sources and low egg predation rates.

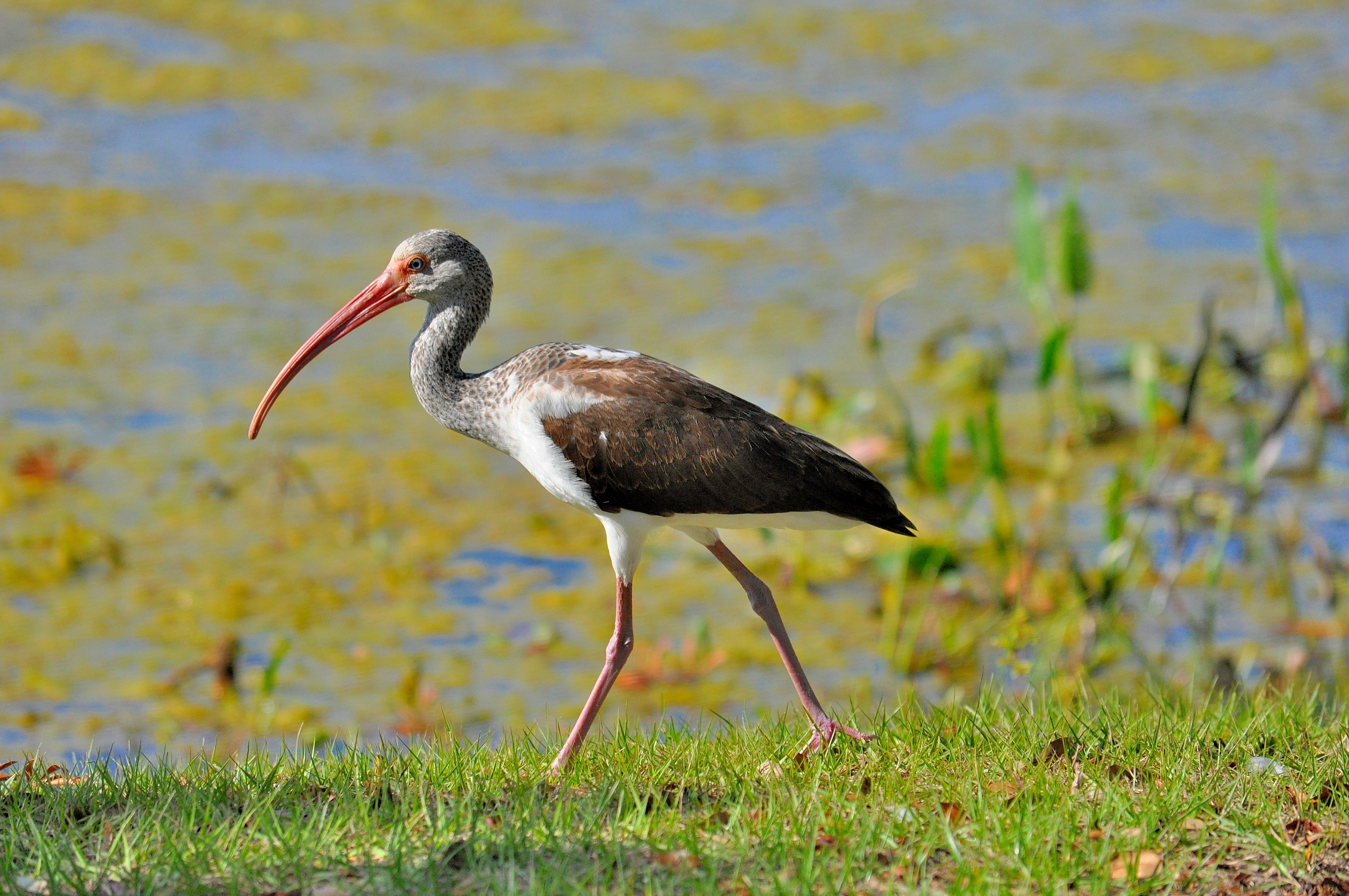
Juvenile in Florida

The eggs hatch after about three weeks and the young are attended by both parents. Males are present around the nest for most of the day, and females most of the night. The parents exchange nest duties in the morning and in the evening. Most of the feeding of the chicks occurs during the period where they swap nesting duties. Little feeding is done in the period of the day that is between the two duty swaps and no feeding is done between midnight and 6 a.m. Chick mortality is highest in the first twenty days post hatching, with anywhere from 37 to 83% of hatchlings surviving to three weeks of age in the Everglades. During periods of food limitations and starvation events, the American white ibis tends to exhibit sex-dependent pre-fledgling mortality. For many bird species that have sexually dimorphic nestlings, mortality rates are higher for larger-sized male nestlings as a result of the parents' inability to meet its greater nutritional needs. However, in the case of the American white ibis, the male nestlings actually have a lower mortality rate as compared to the females despite being on average 15% greater in mass as compared to its female counterparts. Although current research has yet to discover the underlying factors to why the males tend to have better survival rates under such conditions, it is suspected that the parents tend to feed the larger male nestlings first because they are either perceived by the parents to have a higher chance of survival, or, being generally larger, the male nestlings simply out-compete the small females for food.

Bird predators may seize anywhere from 7% to 75% of the progeny in a breeding colony. The fish crow (Corvus ossifragus) is common raider of American white ibis nests, accounting for up to 44% of egg loss in a field study at Battery Island, North Carolina. Other predators of eggs and young include the boat-tailed grackle (Quiscalus major), black-crowned night heron (Nycticorax nycticorax), gulls, and possibly vultures, as well as the common opossum (Didelphis marsupialis), raccoon (Procyon lotor), and rat snakes (Pantherophis species). Egg predation rates of the American white ibis decline with nest age owing to increased nest attentiveness by the parents, especially during the last week of incubation. High nest densities and reduced synchrony increase egg predation rates because of the increased opportunities afforded by the longer incubation times, as well as the greater availability of nests available for predation.

The American white ibis begins breeding in its third summer, although birds in captivity may breed as young as nine or ten months of age. The oldest member of the species recorded in captivity was over 20 years of age, and a wild bird has been picked up 16 years and 4 months after being banded.

=== Diet ===
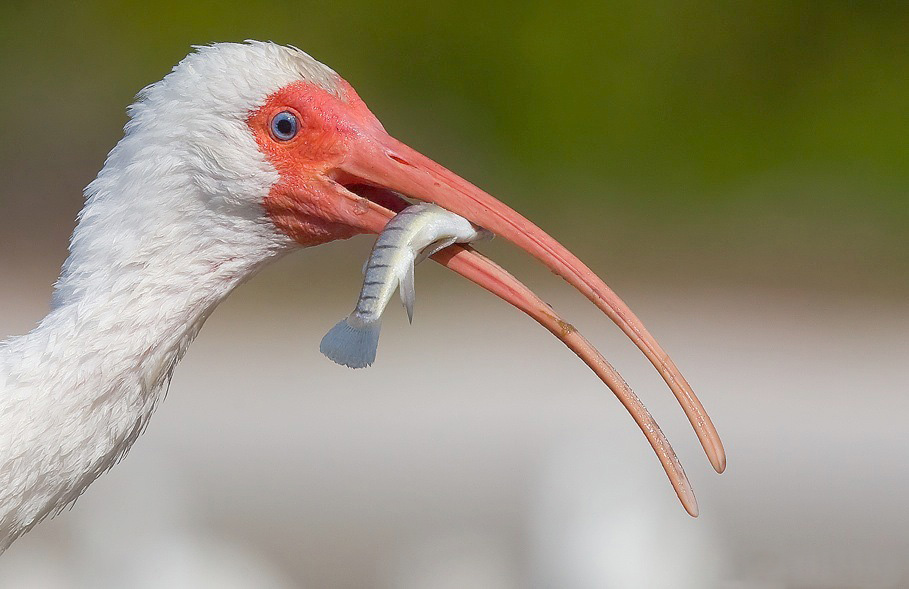
Adult eating a fish

The American white ibis prefers to eat crayfish and other crustaceans, but also takes aquatic insects and small fish. Outside the nesting season, the diet is highly variable, as abundance and types of prey depend on both the region and the habitat. In the Llanos, located in Colombia and Venezuela, the most frequent prey are insects, such as fly larvae and beetles. Generally in North America the main prey are crustaceans, mostly crayfish. In the Everglades and cypress swamps, the diet is primarily made up of crayfish, while those that feed in willow ponds eat predominantly fish. American white ibises that feed in mangrove swamps focus on crabs. The tactile nature of the ibis's probing for food in mud means that it catches prey that are too slow to evade the ibis once located by its bill. In the Everglades, this means that crayfish make up a large part of the diet, but a more diverse array of invertebrates are taken in coastal areas. Although crayfish are sought by foraging ibises, prey switching to fish does occur if fish are found in great abundance. It is unclear whether the fish are more easily caught if overcrowded, or whether sheer numbers of fish mean that ibises are catching them instead of crayfish—normally, fish are more agile than crayfish and hence elude the ibis's bill more easily. Fish are a more energy-rich source of food for the American white ibis. In the breeding season, American white ibises in a colony at Pumpkinseed Island travelled further to forage in freshwater wetlands and catch crayfish, than nearby saltwater areas where fiddler crabs predominated, indicating their benefit was worth the extra energy expended in fetching them for their young. This travel results in the wholesale transport of nutrients across the landscape by the colony; in a successful breeding year the colony at Pumpkinseed Island was estimated to have contributed a third as much phosphorus to the neighboring estuary as other environmental processes.

The American white ibis is found in mixed-species foraging flocks with the glossy ibis (Plegadis falcinellus) in flooded fields, and the two species select different food items with little overlap; the former foraging for crabs and aquatic insects and the latter feeding mainly on grain. The wood stork is also found in the same habitat in Florida, but hunts larger prey and a higher percentage of fish, so there is little overlap. In the Llanos, where American white ibis coexist with the scarlet ibis, their diets differ, the former consuming more bugs, fish and crustaceans, while the latter eat a much higher proportion of beetles. The willet (Tringa semipalmata) has been observed trailing American white ibis and catching prey disturbed by them, and even kleptoparasitizing (stealing) from them, in J. N. "Ding" Darling National Wildlife Refuge on Sanibel Island in Florida. An isolated event of intraspecific predation in juvenile American white ibis has been observed, where a juvenile attacked and consumed a chick from another nest.

=== Foraging ===
Video of adults foraging on Bonita Beach in Bonita Springs, Florida

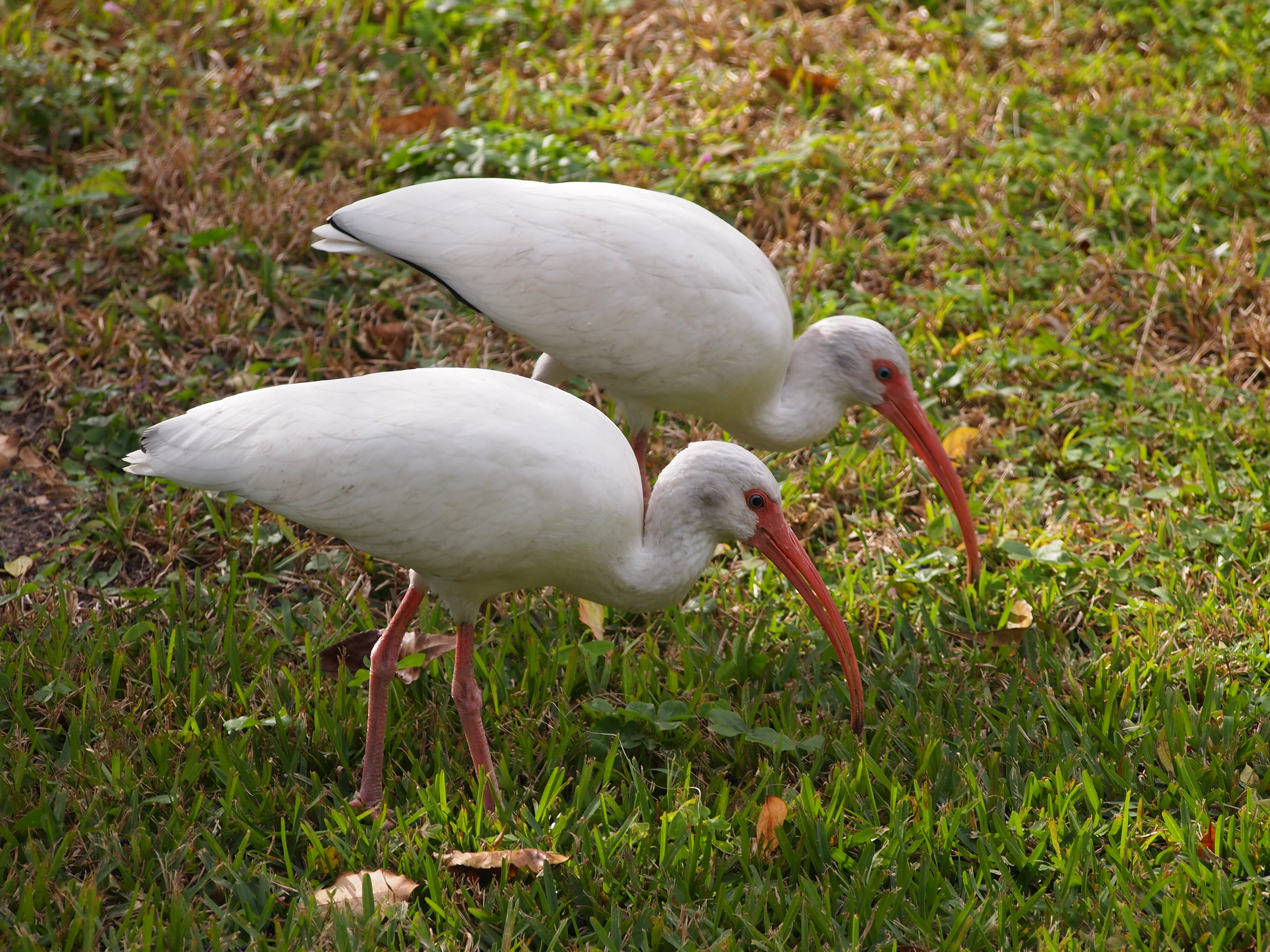
Adult white ibis foraging for food in a front garden in Port Orange, Florida

During the summer, the American white ibis roams along the coast of tidal flats and mangrove swamps as the inland marshes are usually flooded. However, as the water level recedes in the fall, populations at the coast shift their foraging area inland, to inland marshes and swamplands. It has become more common in urban landscapes in Florida since the late 1990s, and is one of a number of wetland-dependent bird species which forages in man-made ponds on golf courses in the southwest of the state.

The American white ibis is a tactile, nonvisual forager, which limits its ability to choose from a wide variety of prey. For the most part, the American white ibis forages for food by tactile probing. It wades slowly through shallow water and sticks its long, downcurved bill into the substrate of the water body with its bill held at around 1 to 2 cm (0.39 to 0.79 in) agape at the tip, and sweeps its long bill back and forth across the bottom to pick out suitable food items. Birds may also probe when standing still. Groping with a wide open bill is a technique used by ibis in deeper water when alone, as is head swinging, in which the ibis swings its wide open bill widely in open water. Others copy this type of foraging if they see one ibis doing it. On land, the American white ibis locates prey by sight and pecks, and does not have to insert its bill into the substrate. The American white ibis seeks small prey when other birds are around, as it needs time to break up larger food items into smaller pieces to eat, and other predators such as herons and egrets often take the opportunity to rob the ibis of its catch. Along with the scarlet ibis, the species coexists with another five species of ibis in the Llanos in Venezuela. American white ibis males are aggressive to and take prey items from smaller ibises, but the smaller females are more often the victims of this behavior.

Juveniles have lower foraging efficiency compared to adults and in most feeding flocks, the juveniles are usually outnumbered by the adults. They usually tend to stay close to one another and forage for food together at the peripheral region of the group. During the breeding season, adult male ibises have been recorded raiding other parent ibises who are feeding their young in the colony. The raiders force their bill down the throat of the victim—either the parent about to disgorge their food or recently fed young—and extract the ball of food. This behavior allows the otherwise starving adult males to obtain food without having to spend long periods of time away from the nest, and prevent its female mate copulating with another male ibis, which would reduce its own reproductive success. Females and juveniles almost never try to drive off the larger and more aggressive pirating males, but instead try to avoid or move away from them. This pirating behavior is less common between two male ibises as the males will actively fight off the pirate. The explanation of the species' sexual dimorphism of body size is unclear, because no differences between the sexes in feeding success rates or the foraging behavior have been observed and, as males are larger, they need more food than females.

== Parasites and mortality ==
Causes of death of adult ibis are not well known. Alligators could feasibly prey on nesting ibises but there has been little research in the area. A flock of fifty adult American white ibis were killed in a fire in the Everglades. The corpses were found in a dense swathe of cattail (Typha angustifolia), which suggested they had taken shelter there. It is unclear why they had not been able to fly away from the fire, but one hypothesis was that they had been foraging for insects disturbed by the fire.

A total of 51 species of parasitic worm have been recovered from the American white ibis, predominantly from the gastrointestinal system and particularly the small intestine. These include Cestoda (tapeworms), Acanthocephala (thorny headed worms), Nematoda (roundworms), Digenea and Spirurida. Several roundworm and spirurid species have been found in the lining of the gizzard. Nematodes are more prevalent in American white ibis from freshwater habitats, and cestodes more frequent in those from saltwater areas. One nematode found in adult birds, Skrjabinoclavia thapari, is borne in the fiddler crab as an intermediate host, while the thorny headed worm species Southwellina dimorpha is carried in crayfish and infests both adult and juvenile ibis.

Parasitic protozoa of the genus Sarcocystis have been recovered from the smooth muscles of adult American white ibis, and another species, Haemoproteus plataleae, has been recovered from the blood of adults and nestlings, and can hence be transmitted before the young leave the nest. The larvae of two species of mite of the family Hypoderidae, Phalacrodectes whartoni and Neoattialges eudocimae, have been recovered from under the skin. Two species of the louse suborder Mallophaga, Plegadiphilus eudocimus and Ardeicola robusta, also parasitise the bird.

In Florida, American white ibises may be eaten by some growth stage of invasive snakes such as Burmese pythons, reticulated pythons, Central African rock pythons, Southern African rock pythons, boa constrictors, yellow anacondas, Bolivian anacondas, dark-spotted anacondas, and green anacondas.

== Status ==
The American white ibis is classed as being of least concern on the IUCN Red List. The population consists of 150,000 mature adults, and is stable, although some populations have unknown trends. A partial survey of under 50% of the North American population published in 2007 found an almost six-fold increase in the last four decades. The estimated breeding range is huge, at 1,200,000 km^{2} (460,000 sq mi). Fluctuating breeding populations and high mobility of colonies make estimating the population difficult. Attempted censuses of breeding colonies across Texas, Louisiana, Florida, and the Carolinas yielded a count of 166,000 breeding birds in 2001, and 209,000 in 2004. The conservation status has been listed in two states—it is a Species of Special Concern in Florida, and a species of Moderate Conservation Concern in Alabama. The preservation of colony sites and freshwater foraging areas is important to maintaining populations; however, the highly mobile nature of breeding colonies makes this challenging.

=== Human impact ===
John James Audubon reported that the American white ibis was hunted and sold in Louisiana, and mainly eaten by American Indians. It had orange flesh and a strong fishy taste. Elsewhere, the flesh has been described as appealing on account of the crayfish diet, and both members of the genus Eudocimus have been hunted, which has been responsible for decline, across their range. Crawfish farmers in Louisiana have also shot them for foraging in crawfish ponds. Overall, the impact of hunting is not thought to be major.

The pollutant methylmercury is a globally distributed neurotoxin and an endocrine system disruptor. In the Everglades ecosystem, human pollution has led to increased concentrations of methylmercury, which have impacted the behaviors of the American white ibis. Hormone levels in males are affected, leading to a decrease in the rates of key courtship behavior, and fewer approaches by females during the mating season. In addition, methylmercury also increased male-male pairing behaviors by 55%. Both the chemically induced "homosexual" behavior and the diminished ability to attract females by males have reduced reproduction rates in affected populations. Exposure of American white ibises to methylmercury causes reduced foraging efficiency and it also makes them more likely to abandon nests owing to the disruptive effect of the pollutant on the bird's hormone systems, which in turn affects parental care behavior. Tests on captive birds have not shown a decreased survival of American white ibis exposed to methylmercury.

== In culture ==
Native American folklore held that the bird was the last to seek shelter before a hurricane, and the first to emerge afterwards. The bird was thus a symbol for danger and optimism. For this reason, the University of Miami adopted the American white ibis as its official athletics mascot in 1926, and the yearbook was known as The Ibis from that year. The mascot was initially known as Ibis before adopting the name Sebastian in 1957. It was named after San Sebastian Hall, a residence hall on campus, which sponsored an Ibis entry in the college's homecoming celebration.

Similar to the University of Miami, South Georgia Tormenta FC uses the ibis as its mascot and nickname, incorporating the bird into the team's crest.
