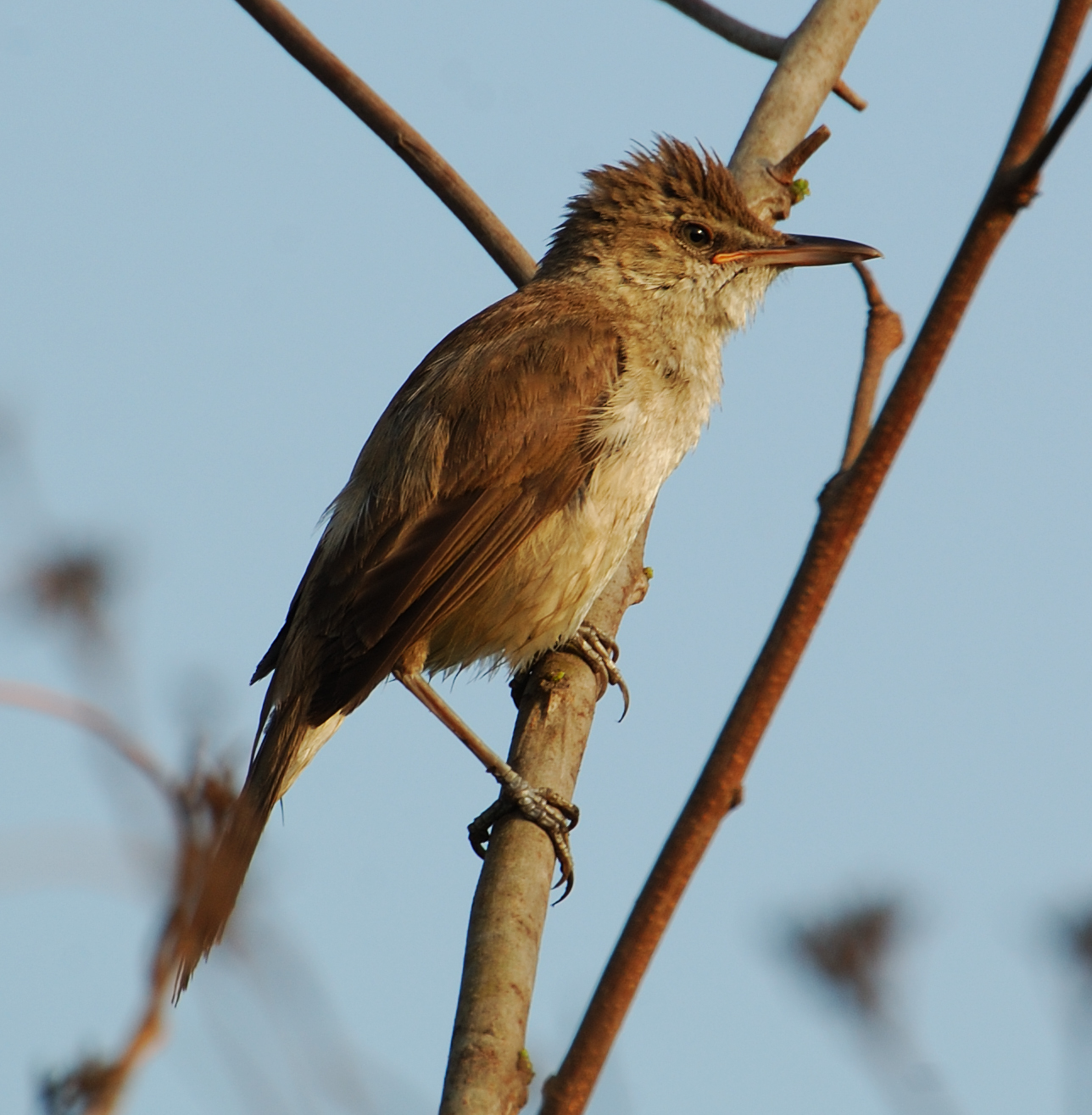

Conservation status
- Least Concern (IUCN 3.1)

Scientific classification
- Kingdom: Animalia
- Phylum: Chordata
- Class: Aves
- Order: Passeriformes
- Family: Acrocephalidae
- Genus: Acrocephalus
- Species: A. stentoreus

Binomial name
- Acrocephalus stentoreus (Hemprich & Ehrenberg, 1833)
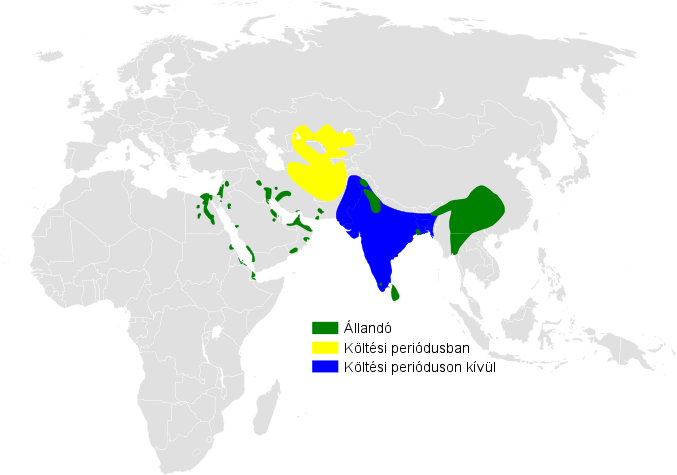
- Distribution of Clamorous Reed Warbler Resident Breeding Non-breeding

= Clamorous reed warbler =

Species of bird

The clamorous reed warbler (Acrocephalus stentoreus) is an Old World warbler in the genus Acrocephalus. It breeds from Egypt eastwards through Pakistan, Afghanistan and northernmost India to south China and southeast Asia. A. s. meridionalis is an endemic race in Sri Lanka.

== Subspecies ==
Nine subspecies are recognised:

- A. s. stentoreus (Hemprich & Ehrenberg, 1833) – Egypt
- A. s. levantinus Roselaar, 1994 – Israel, Jordan, Syria and northwest Arabia
- A. s. brunnescens (Jerdon, 1839) – Red Sea region to Kazakhstan and north India
- A. s. amyae Baker, ECS, 1922 – northeast India, Myanmar, Thailand and south China
- A. s. meridionalis (Legge, 1875) – south India and Sri Lanka
- A. s. harterti Salomonsen, 1928 – Philippines (except Palawan group and Sulu Archipelago)
- A. s. siebersi Salomonsen, 1928 – west Java
- A. s. celebensis Heinroth, 1903 – Sulawesi
- A. s. lentecaptus Hartert, EJO, 1924 – Borneo and central, east Java to Sumbawa (west Lesser Sunda Islands)

== Description ==
Clamorous reed warbler is a large song thrush-sized warbler at 18–20 cm. The adult has an unstreaked brown back and whitish underparts. The forehead is flattened, and the bill is strong and pointed. The sexes are identical, as with most warblers. It is very like the great reed warbler, but that species has richer coloured underparts.

There are a number of races differing in plumage shades. The migratory northern race has the richest brown upperparts, and the endemic Sri Lanka subspecies is the darkest form.

Like most warblers, the clamorous reed warbler is insectivorous, but will take other small prey items.

The song is loud and far-carrying, but less raucous than that of the great reed warbler. It is a slow, chattering kereet-kereet-kereet with typically acrocephaline whistles and mimicry added.

== Habitat ==
Most populations are sedentary, but the breeding birds in Pakistan, Afghanistan and north India are migratory, wintering in peninsular India and Sri Lanka.

Acrocephalus stentoreus - Clamorous Reed Warbler XC129322

This passerine bird is a species found in large reed beds, often with some bushes. 3-6 eggs are laid in a basket nest in reeds.
