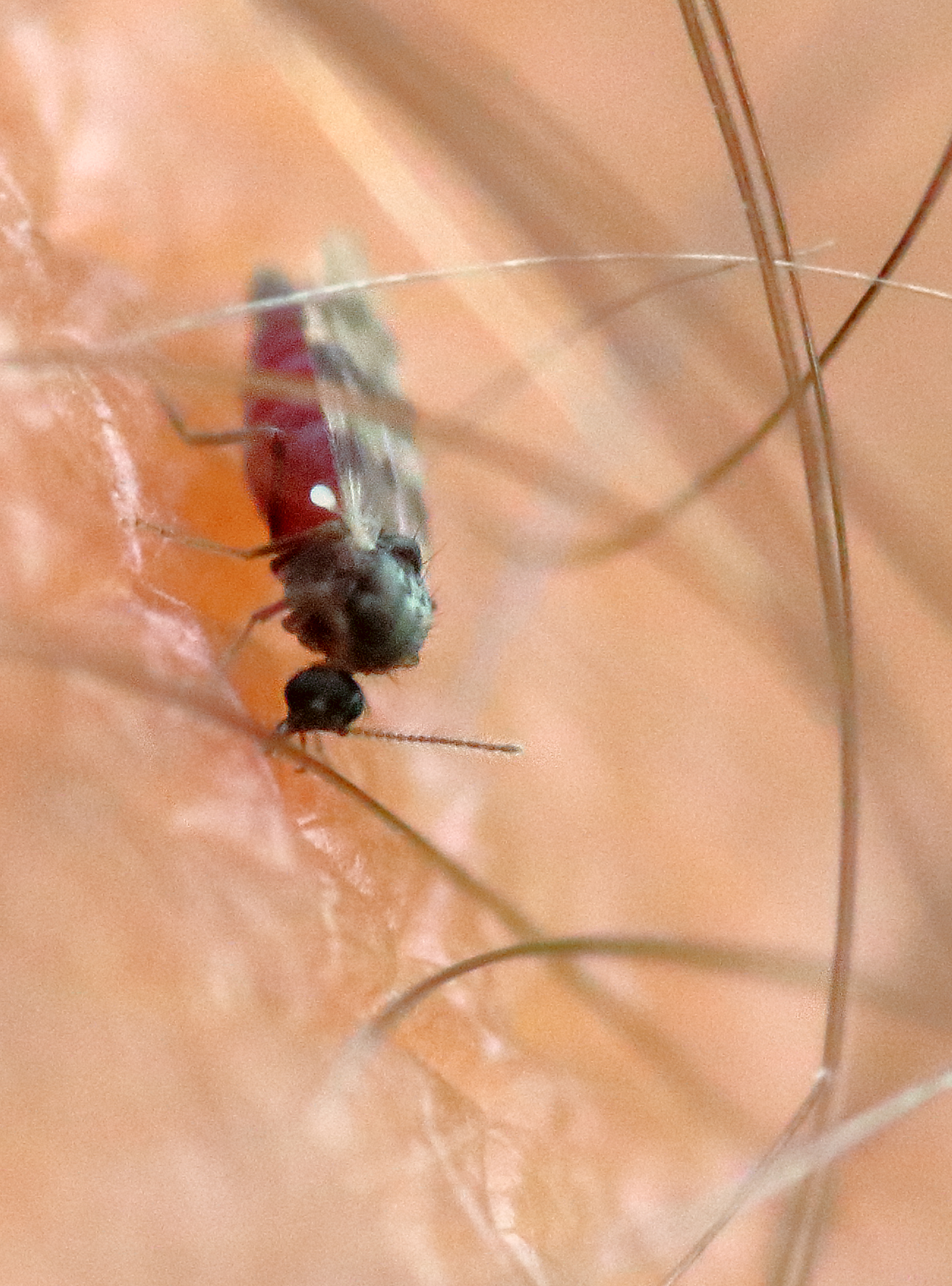

Scientific classification
- Kingdom: Animalia
- Phylum: Arthropoda
- Clade: Pancrustacea
- Class: Insecta
- Order: Diptera
- Family: Ceratopogonidae
- Genus: Culicoides
- Subgenus: Culicoides
- Species: C. impunctatus

Binomial name
- Culicoides impunctatus Goetghebuer, 1920

Synonyms
- C. minor Tokunaga, 1941

= Highland midge =

Species of fly

The highland midge (scientific name: Culicoides impunctatus; Scots: Midgie; Scottish Gaelic: Meanbh-chuileag) is a species of biting midge found across the Palearctic (throughout Britain, Ireland, Scandinavia, other regions of Northern Europe, Russia and Northern China) in upland and lowland areas (fens, bogs and marshes). In the north west of Scotland, and down the Western coast to north Wales, the highland midge is usually very prevalent from late spring to late summer. Female highland midges are well known for gathering in clouds and biting humans, though the majority of the blood they obtain comes from cattle, sheep and deer. The bite of Culicoides may be felt as a sharp prick but is usually unnoticed at the time. It is often followed by irritating lumps that may disappear in a few hours or last for days, depending on the individual.

Following Scotland's exceptionally cold winter in the early part of 2010, scientists found that the prolonged freezing conditions, rather than reducing the following summer's midge population in the Scottish Highlands, in fact increased it as the cold weather had reduced the numbers of its natural predators, such as bats and birds.

== Activity ==
Female midges tend to bite close to their breeding site (although they have been found up to 1 kilometre (1,100 yd)) and near to the ground. They are most active just before dawn and sunset but bite at any time of day. Midges are less active with wind speeds of over 10 km/h (3 m/s; 6 mph), or humidity below 60–75%.

Dry sunny conditions are unfavourable to midges, thus they are prevalent in humid, wet and cloudy conditions. Rain does not deter them, nor does darkness. However, they tend not to go into houses or buildings, but will enter tents and cars.

== Lifecycle ==
According to Wilderness Scotland: "Midges mate and lay eggs in the summer months. The eggs hatch into larvae and will develop whilst living in the boggy soil. Before winter they will reach the final instar stage of their larvae development and become a pupa. The adult midge will emerge from the pupa in spring time."

== Prevention ==
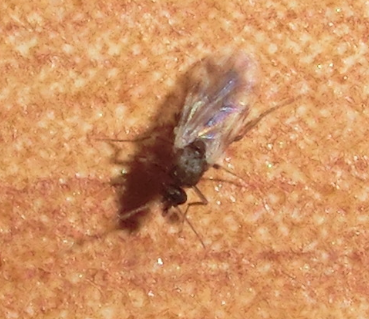

Midge bites may be prevented by wearing clothes to minimise exposed skin and using a midge net to cover the head. Traditionally, oils derived from bog-myrtle, or “Roideag” (Myrica gale), have been used as a mild insect repellent given their monoterpene content of citronellol and limonene.

Insect repellents such as DEET may be used. Newer and safer repellents include Icaridin.
