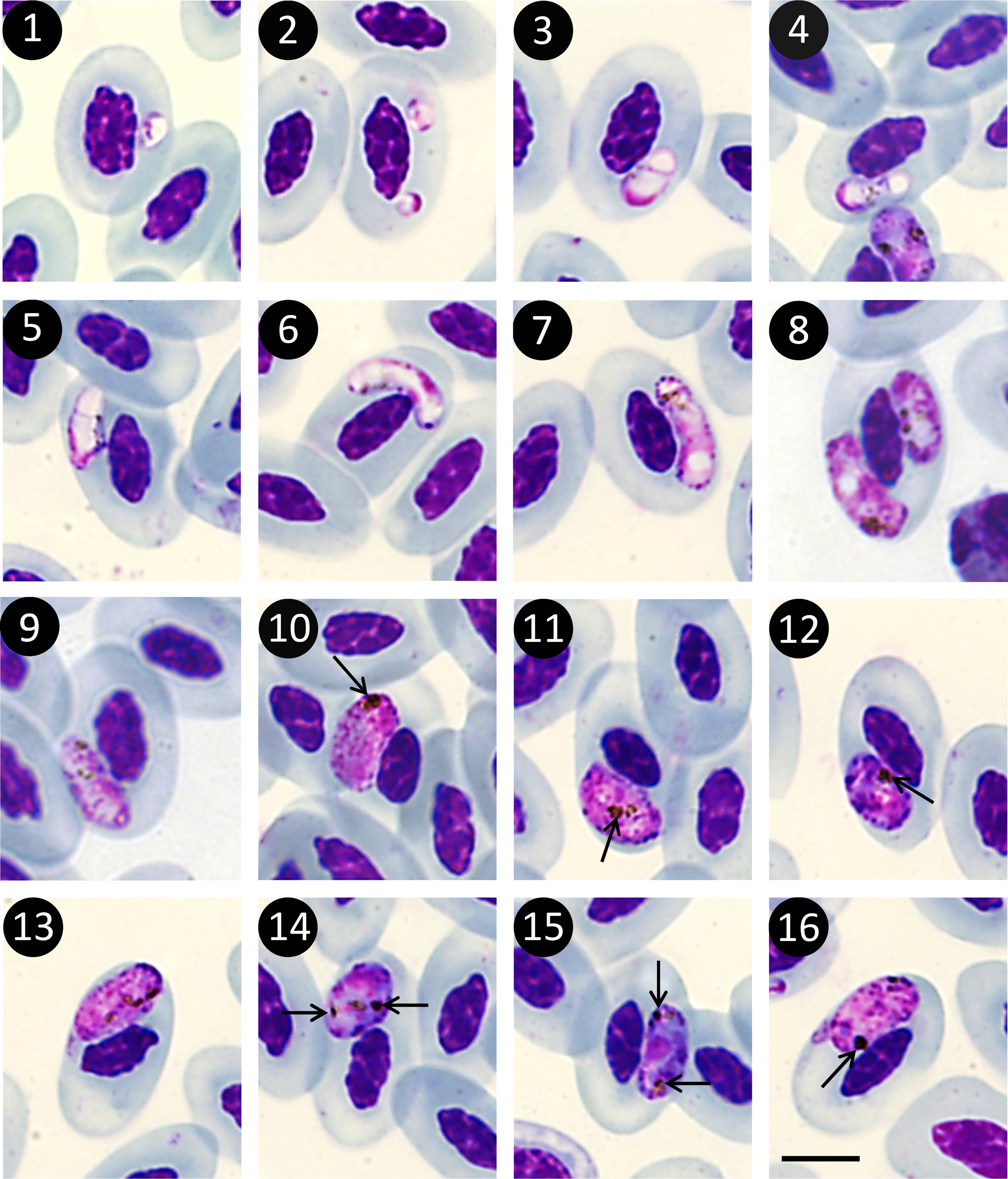
- Haemoproteus ilanpapernai

Scientific classification
- Domain: Eukaryota
- Clade: Sar
- Clade: Alveolata
- Phylum: Apicomplexa
- Class: Aconoidasida
- Order: Chromatorida
- Suborder: Laveraniina
- Family: Haemoproteidae

Genera
- See text

= Haemoproteidae =

Family of single-celled organisms

The Haemoproteidae are a family of parasitic alveolates in the phylum Apicomplexa.

The species in this family produce pigment and do not have an asexual cycle in the blood.

== Taxonomy ==
The genera in this family are:

- Genus Johnsprentia Landau, Chavatte & Beveridge, 2012
- Genus Haemocystidium Castellani and Willey, 1904, emend. Telford, 1996
- Genus Haemoproteus Kruse, 1890
  - Subgenus Parahaemoproteus Bennett et al., 1965
  - Subgenus Haemoproteus
- Genus Paleohaemoproteus Poinar and Telford, 2005
- Genus Sprattiella Landau et al., 2012
