= Chromatorida =

Scientific classification
- Domain: Eukaryota
- Clade: Sar
- Clade: Alveolata
- Phylum: Apicomplexa
- Class: Aconoidasida
- Order: Chromatorida; Euzéby, 1988

Order of single-celled organisms

Chromatorida is an order of pigmented intraerythrocytic parasitic alveolates erected by Jacques Euzéby in 1988.

It has one suborder - Laveraniina with two families - Plasmodiidae and Haemoproteidae.
