= Hippoboscinae =

Scientific classification
- Kingdom: Animalia
- Phylum: Arthropoda
- Clade: Pancrustacea
- Class: Insecta
- Order: Diptera
- Family: Hippoboscidae
- Subfamily: Hippoboscinae; Brues & Melander, 1932

Subfamily of flies

Hippoboscinae is a subfamily of the fly family Hippoboscidae. All are parasitic, and unlike some other members of the Hippoboscidae, all Hippoboscinae are winged species.

== Systematics ==
- Genus Hippobosca Linnaeus, 1758

- Hippobosca camelina Leach, 1817
- Hippobosca equina Linnaeus, 1758
- Hippobosca fulva Austen, 1912
- Hippobosca hirsuta Austen, 1911
- Hippobosca longipennis Fabricius, 1805
- Hippobosca rufipes von Olfers, 1816
- Hippobosca variegata Megerle, 1803

- Genus Struthiobosca Maa, 1963

- S. struthionis (Janson, 1889)
