= H. maculata =

H. maculata may refer to:

- Haemanota maculata, a South American moth
- Haplonerita maculata, a Venezuelan moth
- Heteroscodra maculata, an African tarantula
- Hippobosca maculata, a parasitic fly
- Holbrookia maculata, a phrynosomid lizard
- Horia maculata, a blister beetle
- Hydroptila maculata, a purse-case caddisfly
- Hygrobia maculata, an aquatic beetle
- Hyla maculata, a tree frog
- Hyperplatys maculata, a longhorn beetle
- Hypochaeris maculata, a cat's ear
