= Microlynchia =

Scientific classification
- Kingdom: Animalia
- Phylum: Arthropoda
- Clade: Pancrustacea
- Class: Insecta
- Order: Diptera
- Family: Hippoboscidae
- Subfamily: Ornithomyinae
- Genus: Microlynchia; Lutz, 1915

Type species
- Lynchia pusilla Speiser, 1902

Species
- See text

Genus of flies

Microlynchia is a genus of biting flies in the family of louse flies, Hippoboscidae. There are four known species. All species are parasites of birds. Microlynchia differs from Pseudolynchia in the presence of minute ocelli and a differently shaped scutellum.

== Distribution ==
Found throughout North and Central America, and parts of South America, Galápagos Islands.

== Systematics ==
- Genus Microlynchia Lutz, 1915

- Species group 'a'

- Microlynchia crypturelli Bequaert, 1938
- Microlynchia furtiva Bequaert, 1955
- Microlynchia pusilla (Speiser, 1902)

- Species group 'b'

- Microlynchia galapagoensis Bequaert, 1955
