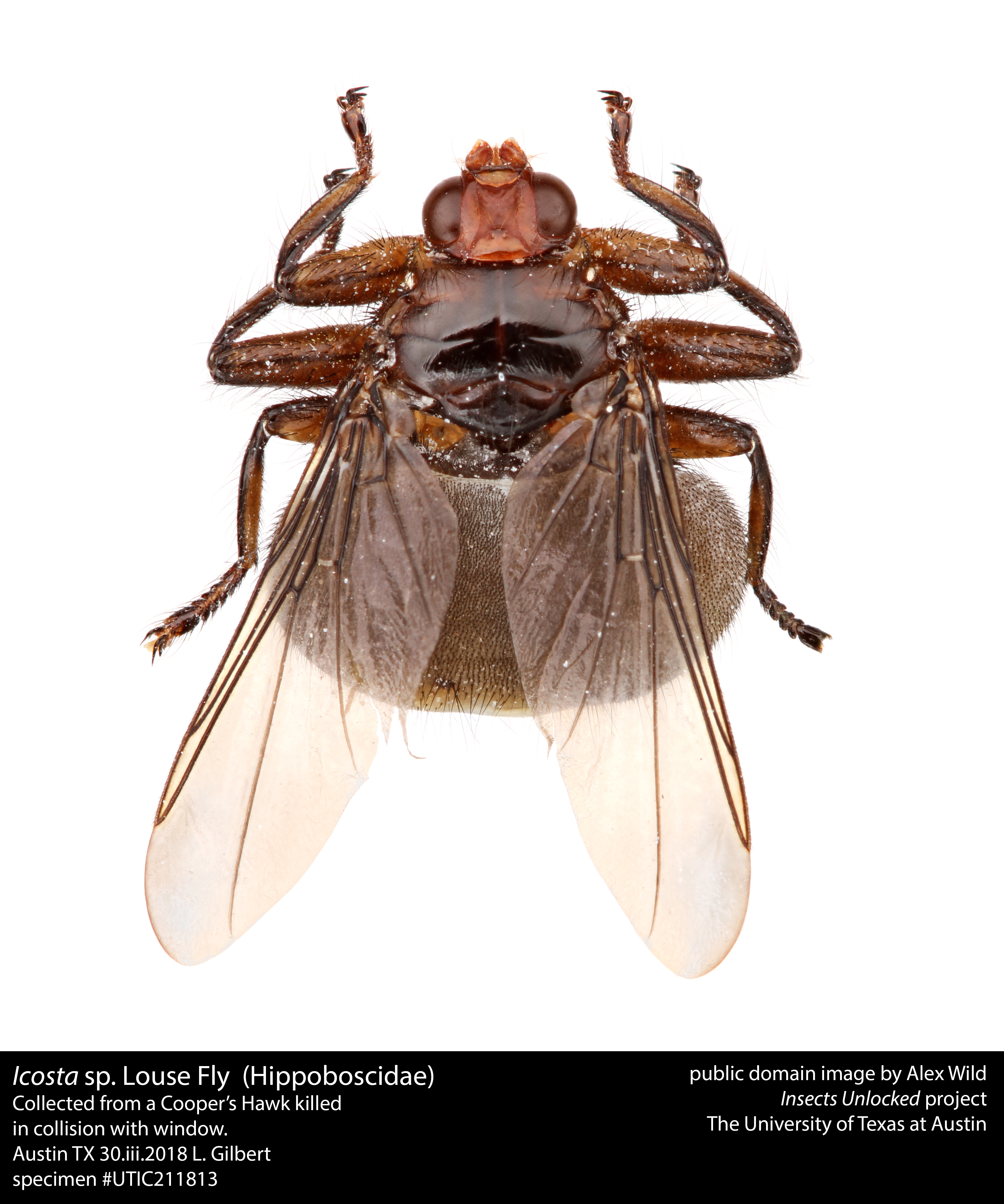
- Icosta sp.

Scientific classification
- Kingdom: Animalia
- Phylum: Arthropoda
- Clade: Pancrustacea
- Class: Insecta
- Order: Diptera
- Family: Hippoboscidae
- Subfamily: Ornithomyinae
- Genus: Icosta; Speiser, 1905

Synonyms
- Ornithoponus Aldrich, 1923 good as subgenus; Olfersia Say 1823

= Icosta =

Genus of flies

Icosta are genus of biting flies in the family of louse flies, Hippoboscidae. There are 52 known species, making it the largest Hippoboscid genus. All species are parasites of birds.

== Distribution ==
Worldwide, excluding Antarctica.

== Systematics ==
- Genus Icosta Speiser, 1905

- Subgenus Ardmoeca

- I. albipennis (Say, 1823)
- I. ardae ardae (Macquart, 1835)

- I. ardae botaurinorum (Swenk, 1916)

- I. holoptera holoptera (Lutz, 1915)

- I. holoptera omnisetosa Maa, 1969

- I. macclurei Maa, 1969
- I. massonnati (Falcoz, 1926)
- I. schoutedeni (Bequaert, 1945)

- Subgenus Gypoeca

- I. meda (Maa, 1963)

- Subgenus Icosta

- I. acromialis acromialis (Speiser, 1904)

- I. acromialis tuberculata (Ferris, 1927)

- I. bicorna (Ferris, 1927)
- I. bucerotina Maa, 1969
- I. chalcolampra (Speiser, 1904)
- I. coalescens (Maa, 1964)
- I. corvina Maa, 1969
- I. diluta Maa, 1969
- I. dioxyrhina (Speiser, 1904)
- I. elbeli Maa, 1969
- I. fenestella Maa, 1969
- I. humilis Maa, 1969
- I. jactatrix Maa, 1969
- I. longipalpis (Macquart, 1835)
- I. malagasii Maa, 1969
- I. mecorrhina (Maa, 1964)
- I. plana (Walker, 1861)
- I. recessa (Maa, 1964)
- I. samoana (Ferris, 1927)
- I. spinosa Maa, 1969
- I. subdentata Maa, 1969
- I. tarsata Maa, 1969
- I. trita (Speiser, 1905)
- I. wenzeli Maa, 1969

- Subgenus Ornithoponus Aldrich, 1923

- I. americana (Leach, 1817)
- I. angustifrons (van der Wulp, 1903)
- I. antica Maa, 1969
- I. australica (Paramonov, 1954)
- I. dukei (Austen, 1911)
- I. hirsuta (Ferris, 1927)
- I. latifacies (Bequaert, 1955)
- I. lonchurae Maa, 1969
- I. maquilingensis (Ferris, 1924)
- I. minor (Bigot in Thomson, 1858)
- I. nigra (Perty, 1833)
- I. papulata Maa, 1969
- I. parallelifrons (Speiser, 1902)
- I. paramonovi Maa, 1969
- I. plaumanni (Bequaert, 1943)
- I. rufiventris (Bigot, 1885)
- I. sensilis sensilis Maa, 1969

- I. sensilis reducta Maa, 1969

- I. simplex (Walker, 1861)
- I. suvaensis (Bequaert, 1941)
- I. tripelta (Maa, 1964)
- I. zumpti (Maa, 1964)

- Subgenus Rhyponotum

- I. pilosa (Macquart, 1843)
