= Ornithoctona =

Scientific classification
- Kingdom: Animalia
- Phylum: Arthropoda
- Class: Insecta
- Order: Diptera
- Family: Hippoboscidae
- Subfamily: Ornithomyinae
- Genus: Ornithoctona; Speiser, 1902

Type species
- Ornithomya erythrocephala Leach, 1817

Species
- See text

Genus of flies

Ornithoctona are genus of biting flies in the family of louse flies, Hippoboscidae. There are 12 known species. All species are parasites of birds.

== Distribution ==
Ornithoctona are found worldwide with the exception of Antarctica.

== Systematics ==
- Genus Ornithoctona Speiser, 1902

- Species group '1'

- Ornithoctona australaisiae (Fabricius, 1805)
- Ornithoctona fusciventris Wiedemann, 1830
- Ornithoctona hulahula Maa, 1969
- Ornithoctona idonea Falcoz, 1929
- Ornithoctona laticornis (Macquart, 1935)
- Ornithoctona oxycera Falcoz, 1929
- Ornithoctona soror Ferris, 1926

- Species group '2'

- Ornithoctona nitens Bigot, 1885
- Ornithoctona orizabae Bequaert, 1954

- Species group '3'

- Ornithoctona erythrocephala (Leach, 1817)

- Species group '4'

- Ornithoctona plicata von Olfers, 1816
- Ornithoctona rugicornis Maa, 1963
