= Stilbometopa =

Scientific classification
- Kingdom: Animalia
- Phylum: Arthropoda
- Class: Insecta
- Order: Diptera
- Family: Hippoboscidae
- Subfamily: Ornithomyinae
- Genus: Stilbometopa; Coquillett, 1899

Type species
- Ornithomyia fulvifrons Walker, 1849

Species
- 5, See text

Synonyms
- Lynchia Weyenbergh, 1881

Genus of flies

Stilbometopa are genus of biting flies in the family of louse flies, Hippoboscidae. There are 5 known species. All species are parasites of birds.

== Distribution ==
Found throughout North, Central, and South America.

== Systematics ==
- Genus Stilbometopa Coquillett, 1899

- S. fulvifrons (Walker, 1849)
- S. impressa (Bigot, 1885)
- S. legtersi Bequaert, 1955
- S. podopostyla Speiser, 1904
- S. ramphastonis Ferris, 1930
