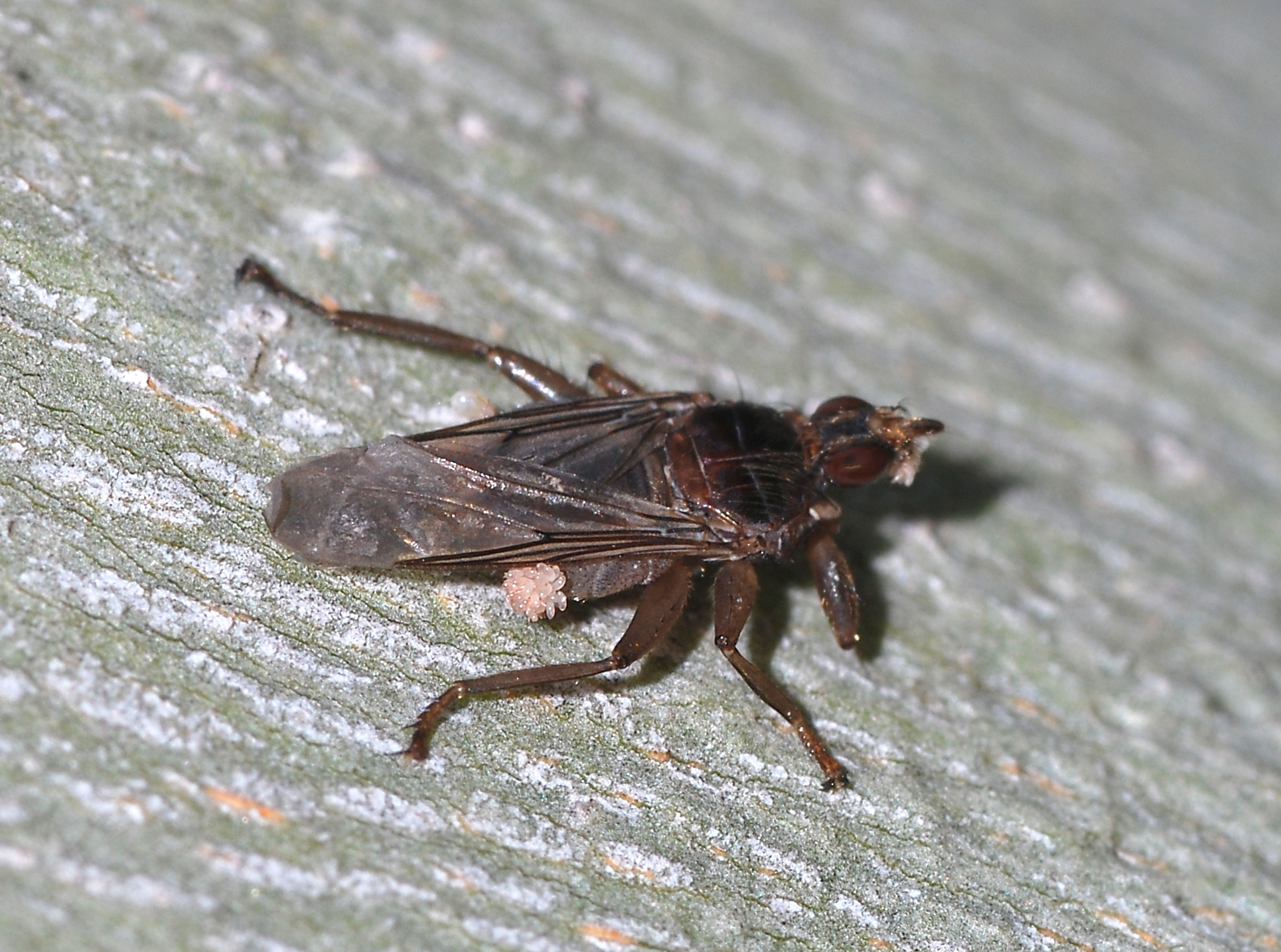
- Pseudolynchia canariensis

Scientific classification
- Kingdom: Animalia
- Phylum: Arthropoda
- Clade: Pancrustacea
- Class: Insecta
- Order: Diptera
- Family: Hippoboscidae
- Subfamily: Ornithomyinae; Bigot, 1853

Genera
- See text

= Ornithomyinae =

Subfamily of flies

Ornithomyinae is a subfamily of the fly family Hippoboscidae. All are blood feeding parasites, for the most part on birds, though some have mammals as hosts.

== Systematics ==
- Subfamily Ornithomyinae Bigot, 1853

- Genus Allobosca Speiser, 1899 (1 species)
- Genus Austrolfersia Bequaert, 1953 (1 species)
- Genus Crataerina von Olfers, 1816 (8 species)
- Genus Icosta Speiser, 1905 (52 species)
- Genus Microlynchia Lutz, 1915 (4 species)
- Genus Myophthiria Rondani, 1875 (13 species)
- Genus Olfersia Leach, 1817 (7 species)
- Genus Ornithoctona Speiser, 1902 (12 species)
- Genus Ornithoica Rondani, 1878 (24 species)
- Genus Ornithomya Latreille, 1802 (29 species)
- Genus Ornithophila Rondani, 1879 (2 species)
- Genus Ortholfersia Speiser, 1902 (4 species)
- Genus Phthona Maa, 1969 (3 species)
- Genus Proparabosca Theodor & Oldroyd 1965 (1 species)
- Genus Pseudolynchia Bequaert, 1926 (5 species)
- Genus Stilbometopa Coquillett, 1899 (5 species)
