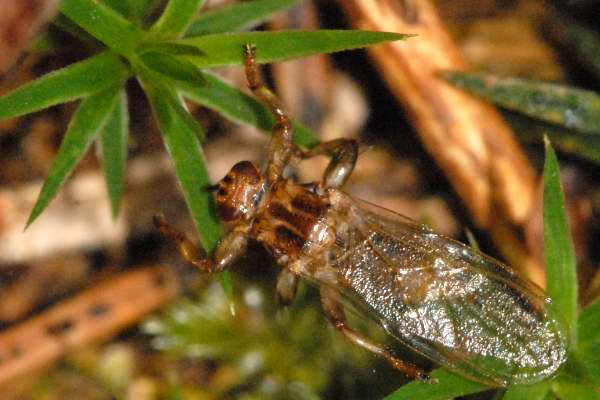
- Ornithomya avicularia

Scientific classification
- Kingdom: Animalia
- Phylum: Arthropoda
- Class: Insecta
- Order: Diptera
- Family: Hippoboscidae
- Subfamily: Ornithomyinae
- Genus: Ornithomya; Latreille, 1802

= Ornithomya =

Genus of flies

Ornithomya are genus of biting flies in the family of louse flies, Hippoboscidae. There are 29 known species. All species are parasites of birds.

== Distribution ==
Ornithomya are found worldwide with the exception of Antarctica, however the largest number of species are found in South East Asia and Africa.

== Systematics ==
- Genus Ornithomya Latreille, 1802

- Species group 'a'

- Ornithomya alpicola Maa, 1975
- Ornithomya anchineuria Speiser, 1905
- Ornithomya apelta Maa, 1969
- Ornithomya avicularia (Linnaeus, 1758)
- Ornithomya bequaerti Maa, 1969
- Ornithomya candida Maa, 1967
- Ornithomya chloropus Bergroth, 1901
- Ornithomya fringillina Curtis, 1836
- Ornithomya fuscipennis Bigot, 1885
- Ornithomya gigantea Bear & Friedberg, 1995
- Ornithomya marginalis Maa, 1964
- Ornithomya medinalis Maa, 1975
- Ornithomya opposita Walker, 1849
- Ornithomya papillosa Maa, 1964
- Ornithomya parva Macquart, 1843

- Species group 'b'

- Ornithomya biloba Dufour, 1827
- Ornithomya cecropis Hutson, 1971
- Ornithomya comosa Kolenati, 1930
- Ornithomya fur Schiner, 1868
- Ornithomya inocellata Ferris, 1930
- Ornithomya roubaudi Séguy, 1938

- Species group 'c'

- Ornithomya ambigua Lutz, 1915
- Ornithomya hoffmannae Bequaert, 1954

- Species group 'd'

- Ornithomya rottensis (Statz, 1940) (fossil)

- Incertae sedis

- Ornithomya areolata Maa, 1986
- Ornithomya clarki Paramonov, 1969
- Ornithomya greeni Maa, 1986
- Ornithomya rupes Hutson, 1981
- Ornithomya sorbens Hutson, 1971
