= Ornithomya cecropis =

Scientific classification
- Domain: Eukaryota
- Kingdom: Animalia
- Phylum: Arthropoda
- Class: Insecta
- Order: Diptera
- Family: Hippoboscidae
- Genus: Ornithomya
- Species: O. cecropis

Binomial name
- Ornithomya cecropis Hutson, 1971

Species of fly

Ornithomya cecropis is a biting fly in the family of louse flies, Hippoboscidae. It was first isolated from the Mascarene martin, Phedina borbonica, in Madagascar.
