= Ornithoica =

Scientific classification
- Kingdom: Animalia
- Phylum: Arthropoda
- Class: Insecta
- Order: Diptera
- Family: Hippoboscidae
- Subfamily: Ornithomyinae
- Genus: Ornithoica; Rondani, 1878

Genus of flies

Ornithoica are a genus of biting flies in the family of louse flies, Hippoboscidae. There are 23 known species. All species are parasites of birds.

== Distribution ==
Ornithoica are found worldwide with the exception of Antarctica, however the largest number of species are found in South East Asia.

== Systematics ==
- Genus Ornithoica Rondani, 1878

- Subgenus Ornithoica Rondani, 1878

- Ornithoica unicolor Speiser, 1900
- Ornithoica confluenta (Say, 1823)
- Ornithoica podicipis Von Roder, 1892
- Ornithoica beccariina Rondani, 1878
- Ornithoica caleconica Sinclair, 1997
- Ornithoica turdi (Latreille, 1812)
- Ornithoica vicina (Walker, 1849)
- Ornithoica zamicra Maa, 1966
- Ornithoica rabori Maa, 1966
- Ornithoica bistativa Maa, 1966
- Ornithoica philippinensis Ferris, 1927
- Ornithoica stipituri (Schiner, 1868)
- Ornithoica tridens Maa, 1966
- Ornithoica momiyamai Kishida, 1932
- Ornithoica simplicis Maa, 1966
- Ornithoica hovana Maa, 1966
- Ornithoica exilis (Walker, 1861)
- Ornithoica podargi Maa, 1966
- Ornithoica aequisenta Maa, 1966
- Ornithoica punctatissima Maa, 1966
- Ornithoica pusilla (Schiner, 1868)

- Subgenus Lobolepis Maa, 1966

- Ornithoica submicans Maa, 1963
- Ornithoica curvata Maa, 1963
- Ornithoica hirtisternum Maa, 1963
