= Ornithophila =

Scientific classification
- Kingdom: Animalia
- Phylum: Arthropoda
- Class: Insecta
- Order: Diptera
- Family: Hippoboscidae
- Subfamily: Ornithomyinae
- Genus: Ornithophila; Rondani, 1879

Type species
- Ornithomyia metallica Schiner, 1864

Species
- See text

Synonyms
- Ornitheza Speiser, 1902

Genus of flies

Ornithophila are a genus of biting flies in the family of louse flies, Hippoboscidae. There are two known species. Both species are parasites of birds.

== Distribution ==
Ornithophila are found worldwide with the exception of the Americas and Antarctica.

== Systematics ==
- Genus Ornithophila Rondani, 1879

- O. gestroi (Rondani, 1878)
- O. metallica (Schiner, 1864)
