= Olfersia =

Olfersia is the scientific name of two genera of organisms and may refer to:

- Olfersia (fly), a genus of insects in the family Hippoboscidae
- Olfersia (plant), a genus of insects in the family Dryopteridaceae
