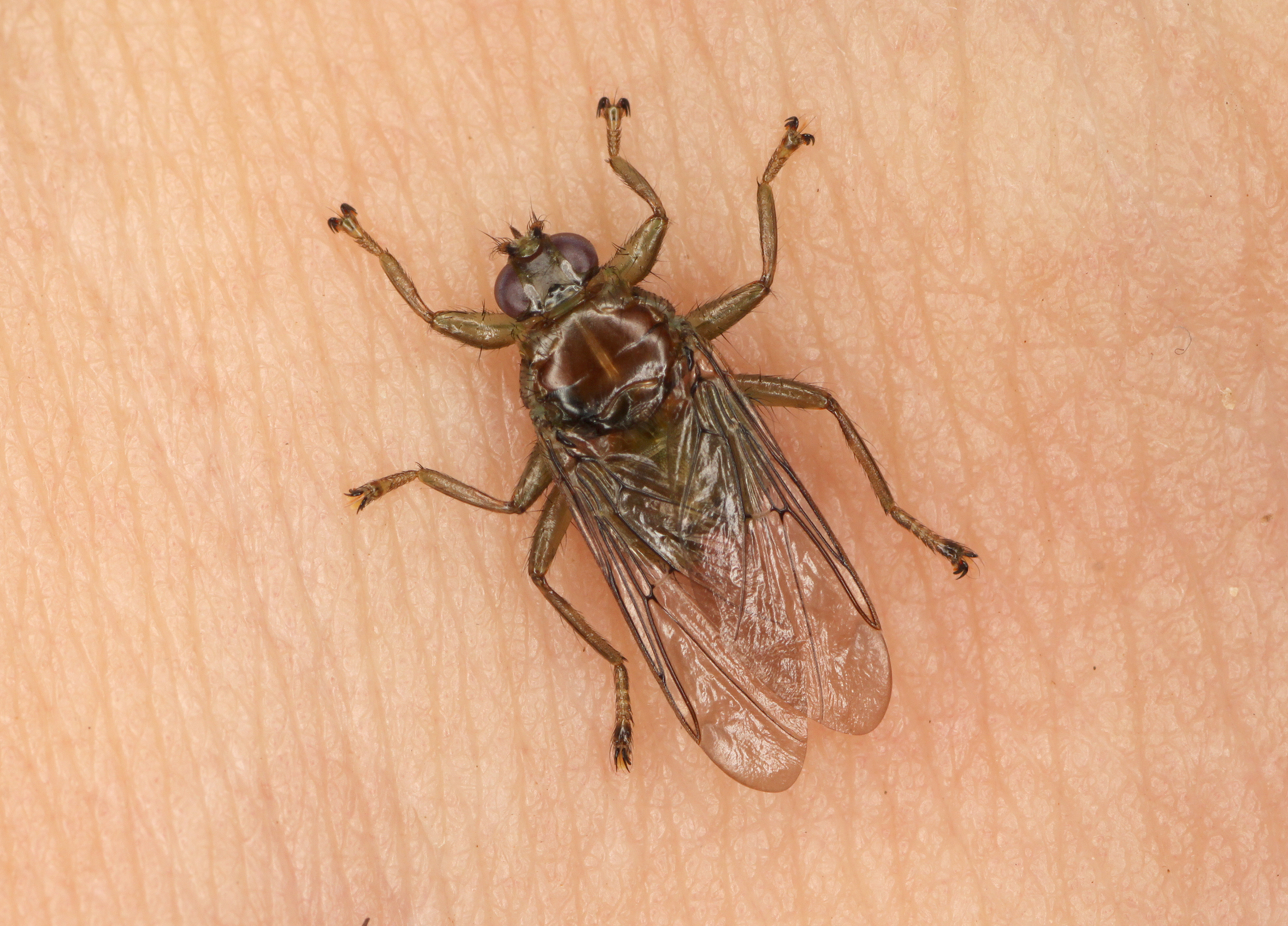

Scientific classification
- Kingdom: Animalia
- Phylum: Arthropoda
- Class: Insecta
- Order: Diptera
- Family: Hippoboscidae
- Genus: Ornithomya
- Species: O. avicularia

Binomial name
- Ornithomya avicularia (Linnaeus, 1758)

= Ornithomya avicularia =

Species of fly

Ornithomya avicularia is a species of fly in the family Hippoboscidae. It is found in the Palearctic. The species prefers tree-dwelling birds as hosts.
