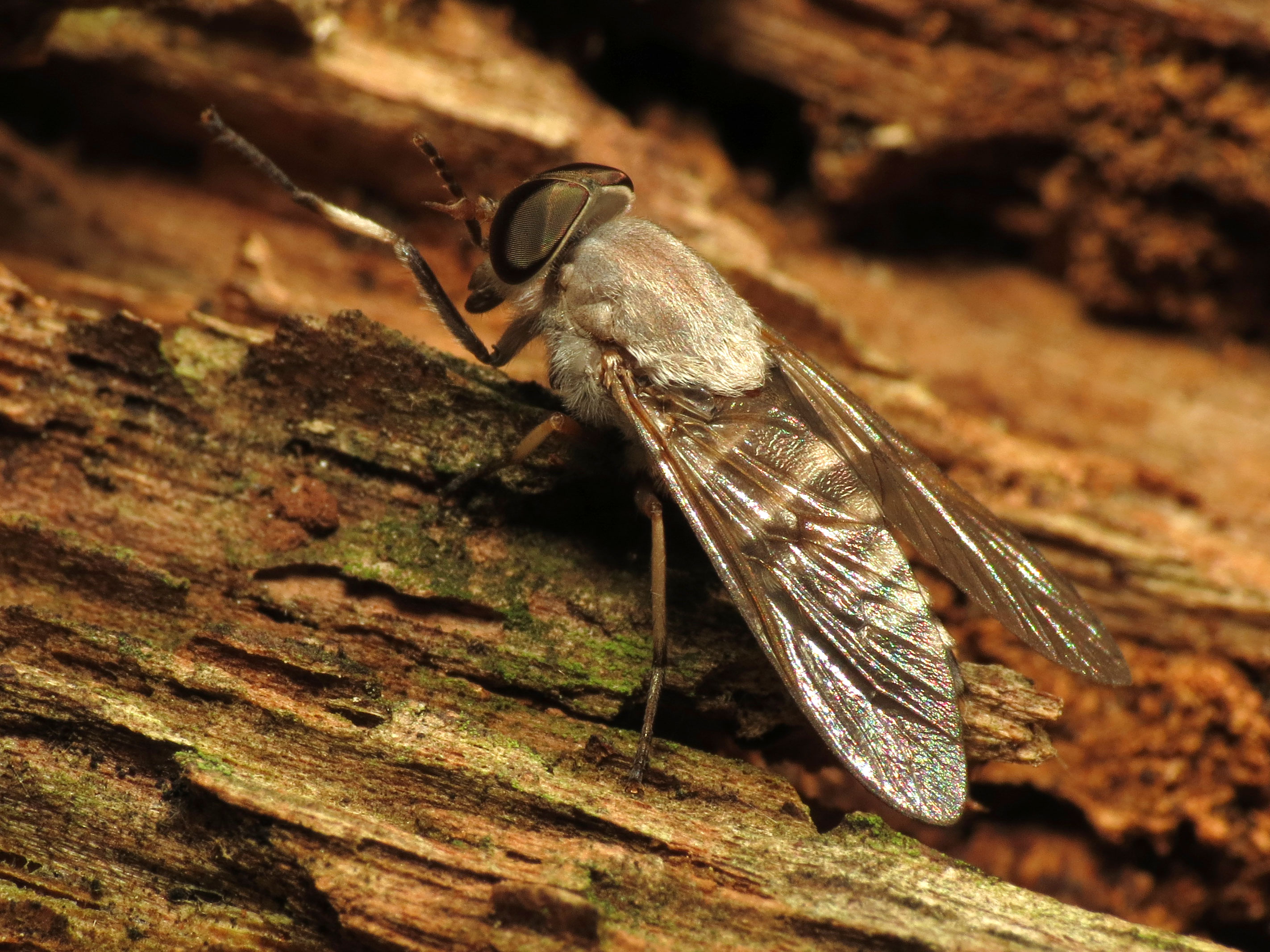
- Leucotabanus annulatus

Scientific classification
- Kingdom: Animalia
- Phylum: Arthropoda
- Class: Insecta
- Order: Diptera
- Family: Tabanidae
- Subfamily: Tabaninae
- Tribe: Diachlorini
- Genus: Leucotabanus; Lutz, 1913

Type species
- Tabanus leucaspis Wiedemann, 1828

= Leucotabanus =

Genus of flies

Leucotabanus is a genus of horse flies in the family Tabanidae.

== Species ==
- Leucotabanus albibasis (Brèthes, 1910)
- Leucotabanus albovarius (Walker, 1854)
- Leucotabanus ambiguus Stone, 1938
- Leucotabanus annulatus (Say, 1823)
- Leucotabanus aurarius Fairchild, 1953
- Leucotabanus canithorax Fairchild, 1941
- Leucotabanus cornelianus Fairchild, 1985
- Leucotabanus exaestuans (Linnaeus, 1758)
- Leucotabanus flavinotum (Kröber, 1934)
- Leucotabanus itzarus (Bequaert, 1932)
- Leucotabanus janinae Fairchild, 1970
- Leucotabanus leucogaster Fairchild, 1951
- Leucotabanus nigriventris Kröber, 1931
- Leucotabanus pallidus Kröber, 1929
- Leucotabanus pauculus Fairchild, 1951
- Leucotabanus sebastianus Fairchild, 1941
- Leucotabanus weyrauchi Fairchild, 1951
