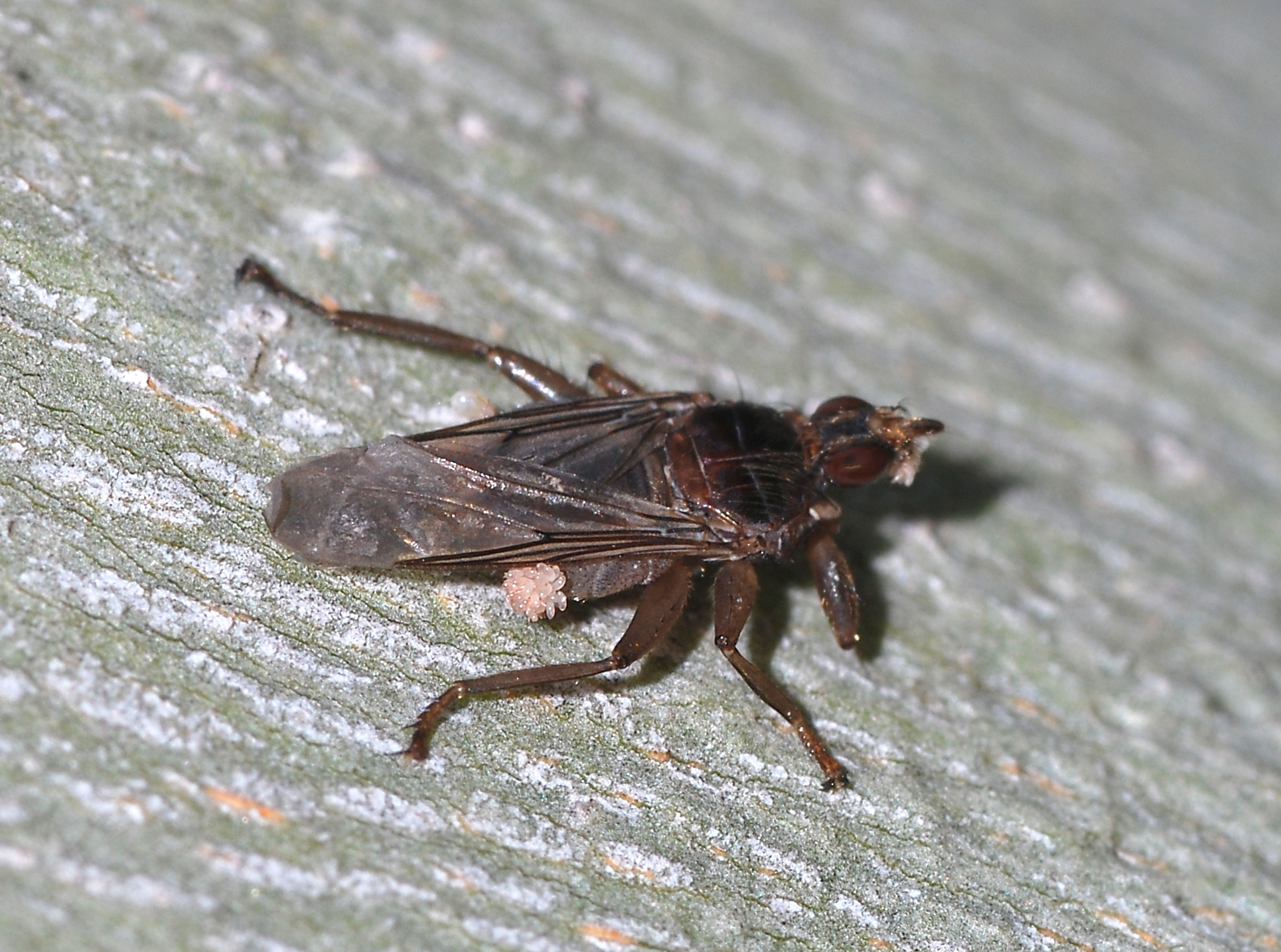

Scientific classification
- Kingdom: Animalia
- Phylum: Arthropoda
- Class: Insecta
- Order: Diptera
- Family: Hippoboscidae
- Subfamily: Ornithomyinae
- Genus: Pseudolynchia
- Species: P. canariensis

Binomial name
- Pseudolynchia canariensis (Macquart, 1839)

Synonyms
- Lynchia simillima Speiser, 1904; Olfersia canariensis Macquart, 1839; Olfersia capensis Bigot, 1885; Olfersia exornata Speiser, 1900; Olfersia falcinelli Rondani, 1879; Olfersia lividicolor Bigot, 1885; Olfersia maura Bigot, 1885; Olfersia rufipes Macquart, 1848; Olfersia testacea Macquart, 1844

= Pseudolynchia canariensis =

Species of fly

Pseudolynchia canariensis, the pigeon louse fly or pigeon fly, is a species of biting fly in the family of louse flies, Hippoboscidae.

== Distribution ==
Pseudolynchia canariensis are species-specific (Columbidae) obligate ectoparasites potentially found in many parts of world where domestic pigeons are kept. Known from wild or feral hosts in continental Africa, the Mediterranean Sub-region, Afghanistan, India, Bangladesh, Nepal, Thailand, Taiwan, Ryukyu Islands, the Philippines, Malaya, and Indonesia, as well as North America and South America in warmer latitudes.

== Hosts ==
In 1931, G. Robert Coatney conducted an experiment to determine if pigeon louse flies would bite humans and survive on human blood and he found they could not. The only wild hosts are pigeons and doves (Columbidae). In domestic settings they have been recorded from 33 genera, 13 families and 8 orders of birds.

== Disease vector ==
Pseudolynchia canariensis is the definitive host (sexual reproduction takes place in the insect vector) for the protozoan Haemoproteus columbae or pigeon malaria and transmits this parasite to Columbiformes. This parasite can be fatal to young rock pigeons in extremely infected birds. However, more often, H. columbae is quite benign and an experimental study found no difference in experimentally infected birds and those in the surrounding population when followed from nestlings through young adults and monitored for survival. The global distribution of H. columbae described in rock pigeons may provide evidence for the wide range of P. canariensis.

Ischnoceran lice are often found on several hippoboscid flies. This is a phoretic association, meaning the lice catch a ride on the flies to move between bird hosts, and the lice do not feed on the flies.

Pigeon flies themselves are commonly infested with hyperparasitic mites such as Myialges anchora.
