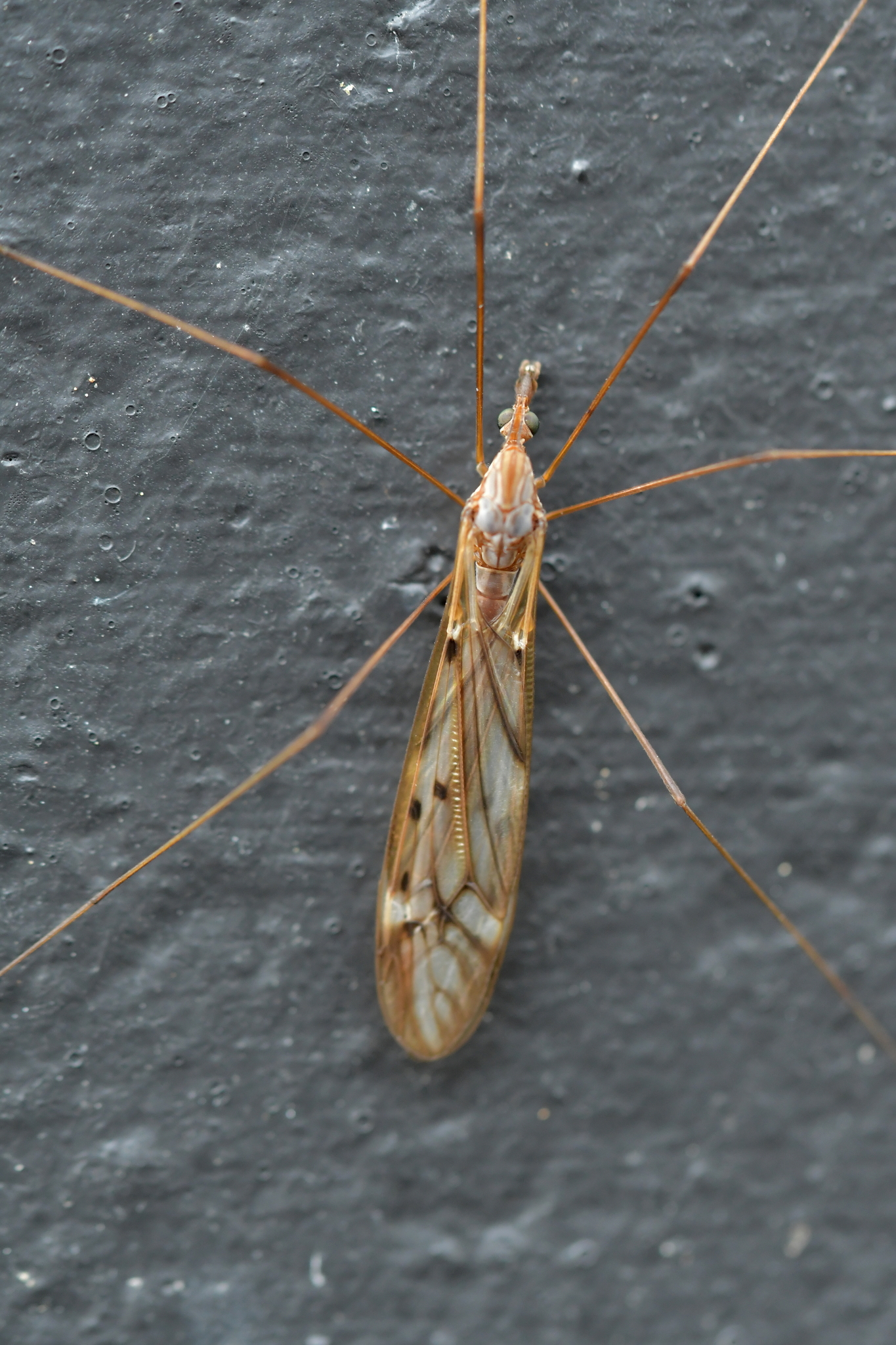
- Zelandotipula novarae

Scientific classification
- Kingdom: Animalia
- Phylum: Arthropoda
- Class: Insecta
- Order: Diptera
- Family: Tipulidae
- Subfamily: Tipulinae
- Genus: Zelandotipula; Alexander, 1922

Type species
- Tipula novarae Schiner, 1868

Species
- See text

= Zelandotipula =

Genus of flies

Zelandotipula is a genus of true crane fly.

== Species ==
- Z. acutistyla (Alexander, 1946)
- Z. associans (Walker, 1861)
- Z. austrofurcifera Alexander, 1969
- Z. azuayensis Alexander, 1980
- Z. bisatra (Alexander, 1962)
- Z. calvicornis (Edwards, 1920)
- Z. calypso (Alexander, 1946)
- Z. catamarcensis (Alexander, 1920)
- Z. celestissima (Alexander, 1954)
- Z. chimborazo (Alexander, 1946)
- Z. corynostyla Alexander, 1969
- Z. cristalta (Alexander, 1946)
- Z. cristifera (Alexander, 1946)
- Z. cristobtusa (Alexander, 1946)
- Z. daedalus Alexander, 1976
- Z. diducta Alexander, 1969
- Z. exserrata Alexander, 1981
- Z. fassliana (Alexander, 1962)
- Z. flavicornis (Alexander, 1914)
- Z. flavogenualis (Alexander, 1946)
- Z. forsteriana (Alexander, 1962)
- Z. fulva (Hutton, 1900)
- Z. furcifera (Alexander, 1944)
- Z. gracilipes (Walker, 1837)
- Z. hirtistylata Alexander, 1976
- Z. horni (Alexander, 1926)
- Z. infernalis (Alexander, 1947)
- Z. juturna (Alexander, 1946)
- Z. laevis (Alexander, 1914)
- Z. lassula (Alexander, 1940)
- Z. longitarsis (Macquart, 1846)
- Z. luteivena (Alexander, 1946)
- Z. melanopodia Alexander, 1980
- Z. monostictula (Alexander, 1946)
- Z. nebulipennata Alexander, 1980
- Z. neurotrichia (Alexander, 1962)
- Z. nigrosetosa (Alexander, 1946)
- Z. novarae (Schiner, 1868)
- Z. orophila (Alexander, 1914)
- Z. otagana (Alexander, 1922)
- Z. parviceps (Speiser, 1909)
- Z. parvimacula (Alexander, 1945)
- Z. perlongistyla Alexander, 1980
- Z. perobtusa Alexander, 1969
- Z. perstrangalia (Alexander, 1962)
- Z. peruviana (Alexander, 1914)
- Z. plagifera (Alexander, 1943)
- Z. retrorsa Alexander, 1969
- Z. ringens (Alexander, 1935)
- Z. schineri (Alexander, 1934)
- Z. septemlineata Alexander, 1980
- Z. serratimargo Alexander, 1970
- Z. sinuosa (Alexander, 1927)
- Z. songoensis (Alexander, 1962)
- Z. strangalia (Alexander, 1927)
- Z. subcalypso Alexander, 1980
- Z. subfurcifer (Alexander, 1945)
- Z. sublaevis (Alexander, 1938)
- Z. subtarda (Alexander, 1935)
- Z. tarda (Alexander, 1935)
- Z. triatra (Alexander, 1962)
- Z. trichoneura (Alexander, 1962)
- Z. tuberculifera (Alexander, 1954)
- Z. uniatra (Alexander, 1946)
- Z. vivida (Alexander, 1941)
- Z. vulpes (Alexander, 1945)
- Z. wardiana Alexander, 1981
- Z. yungasicola (Alexander, 1962)
- Z. zamorae (Alexander, 1946)
