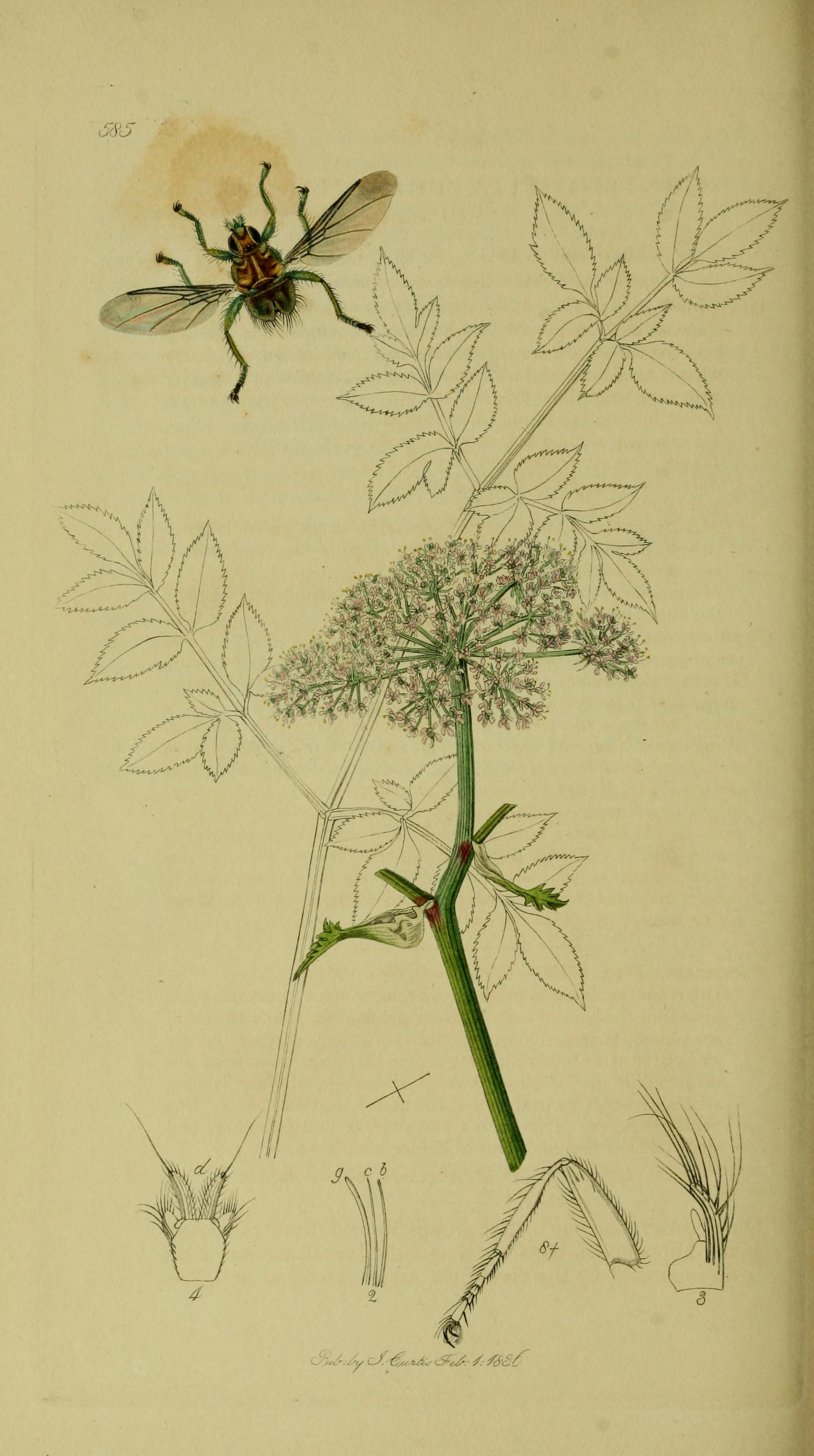
- Ornithomya fringillina in British Entomology

Scientific classification
- Kingdom: Animalia
- Phylum: Arthropoda
- Class: Insecta
- Order: Diptera
- Family: Hippoboscidae
- Genus: Ornithomya
- Species: O. fringillina

Binomial name
- Ornithomya fringillina Curtis, 1836

= Ornithomya fringillina =

Species of fly

Ornithomya fringillina is a species of fly in the family Hippoboscidae. It is found in the Palearctic.
