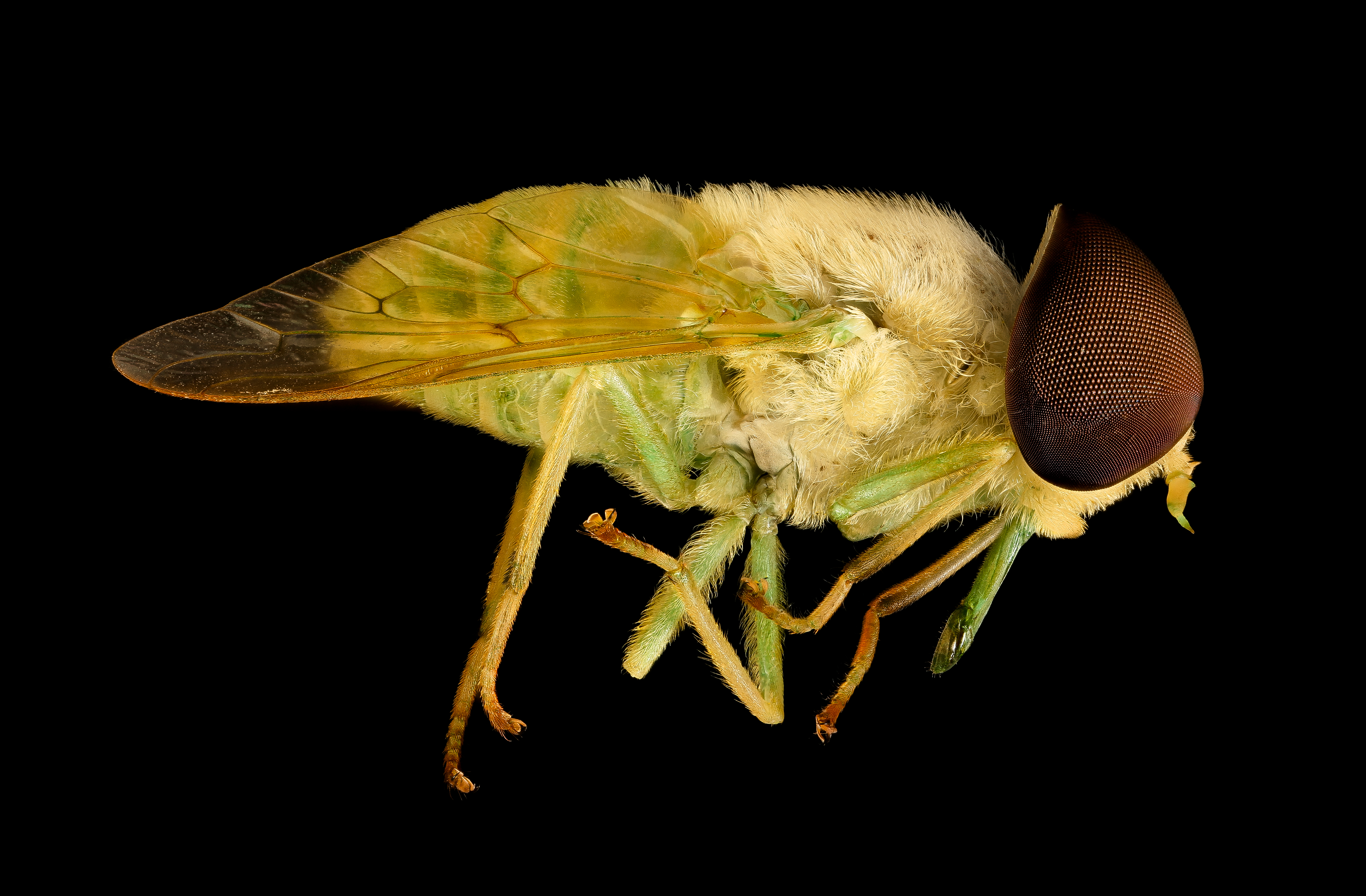
- Chlorotabanus crepuscularis (Green horse fly)

Scientific classification
- Kingdom: Animalia
- Phylum: Arthropoda
- Class: Insecta
- Order: Diptera
- Family: Tabanidae
- Subfamily: Tabaninae
- Tribe: Diachlorini
- Genus: Chlorotabanus
- Species: C. crepuscularis

Binomial name
- Chlorotabanus crepuscularis Bequaert, 1926

Synonyms
- Tabanus flavus Macquart, 1834

= Chlorotabanus crepuscularis =

Species of fly

Chlorotabanus crepuscularis is a species of horse flies in the family Tabanidae. This species is the only green tabanid in North America. It can be found from Texas to Delaware. In Florida, this sanguinivorous (blood-feeding) fly is seen as an adult from March through September, but is most active from May to mid-July.

The female has the ability to sense carbon dioxide, which helps it feed on mammals, especially during the night when it is most active. The larvae are also predaceous and live in the soil adjacent to water and on floating vegetation but can also live in forest sand. The insect's blood is blue. The fly's eyes are brown, but glow yellow under 385 nm UV light.
