= Myophthiria =

Scientific classification
- Kingdom: Animalia
- Phylum: Arthropoda
- Class: Insecta
- Order: Diptera
- Family: Hippoboscidae
- Subfamily: Ornithomyinae
- Genus: Myophthiria; Rondani, 1875

Species
- See text

Genus of flies

Myophthiria is a genus of biting flies in the family of louse flies, Hippoboscidae. There are 13 known species. All species are Parasites of birds.

== Distribution ==
Myophthiria are found worldwide with the exception of Antarctica.

== Systematics ==
- Genus Myophthiria Rondani, 1875

- Species group '1' (Old World)

- M. capsoides Rondani, 1878
- M. lyaeoides Rondani, 1878
- M. reduvioides Rondani, 1875

- Species group '2' (New World)

- M. fimbriata (Waterhouse, 1887)
- M. neotropica Bequaert, 1943

- Incertae sedis

- M. figiarum Maa, 1980
- M. javanica Maa, 1980
- M. malayna Maa, 1980
- M. neocaledonica Maa, 1980
- M. neohebudarum Maa, 1980
- M. queenslandae Maa, 1980
- M. wilsoni Maa, 1980
- M. zelanica Maa, 1980
