= Austrolfersia =

Scientific classification
- Kingdom: Animalia
- Phylum: Arthropoda
- Clade: Pancrustacea
- Class: Insecta
- Order: Diptera
- Family: Hippoboscidae
- Subfamily: Ornithomyinae
- Genus: Austrolfersia; Bequaert, 1953
- Species: A. ferrisi

Binomial name
- Austrolfersia ferrisi Bequaert, 1953

Genus of flies

Austrolfersia is a genus of biting flies in the family of louse flies, Hippoboscidae. There is only one known species, Austrolfersia ferrisi Bequaert, 1953. It is a parasite of Diprotodontia.

== Distribution ==
It is only found in Queensland, Australia.

== Hosts ==
Red-legged pademelon (Thylogale stigmatica) and the musky rat-kangaroo (Hypsiprymnodon moschatus)
