= Phthona =

Scientific classification
- Kingdom: Animalia
- Phylum: Arthropoda
- Clade: Pancrustacea
- Class: Insecta
- Order: Diptera
- Family: Hippoboscidae
- Subfamily: Ornithomyinae
- Genus: Phthona; Maa, 1963

Type species
- Phthona nigrita Speiser, 1905

Species
- 3. See text

Genus of flies

Phthona is a genus of biting flies in the family of louse flies, Hippoboscidae. There are 3 known species. All are parasite of falconets of the genus Microhierax.

== Distribution ==
All species are found in South East Asia.

== Hosts ==
They found on birds of the genus Microhierax - species: collared falconet (M. caerulescens), Philippine falconet (M. erythrogenys) and the pied falconet (M. melanoleucus)

== Systematics ==
- Genus Phthona Maa, 1969

- P. leptoptera (Maa, 1963)
- P. modesta (Maa, 1963)
- P. nigrita (Speiser, 1905)
