= Acarozumia =

Scientific classification
- Domain: Eukaryota
- Kingdom: Animalia
- Phylum: Arthropoda
- Class: Insecta
- Order: Hymenoptera
- Family: Vespidae
- Subfamily: Eumeninae
- Genus: Acarozumia; Bequaert, 1921

Species
- Acarozumia amaliae; Acarozumia matthewsi; Acarozumia nigroflava

Genus of wasps

Acarozumia is an Australasian genus of potter wasps.
