= Allobosca =

Scientific classification
- Kingdom: Animalia
- Phylum: Arthropoda
- Clade: Pancrustacea
- Class: Insecta
- Order: Diptera
- Family: Hippoboscidae
- Subfamily: Ornithomyinae
- Genus: Allobosca; Speiser, 1899
- Species: A. crassipes

Binomial name
- Allobosca crassipes Speiser, 1899

Genus of flies

Allobosca is a genus of biting flies in the family of louse flies, Hippoboscidae. There is only one known species, Allobosca crassipes Speiser, 1899. It is a parasite of lemurs. It has only rudimentary wings.

== Distribution ==
It is only found in Madagascar.
