= Ortholfersia =

Scientific classification
- Kingdom: Animalia
- Phylum: Arthropoda
- Clade: Pancrustacea
- Class: Insecta
- Order: Diptera
- Family: Hippoboscidae
- Subfamily: Ornithomyinae
- Genus: Ortholfersia; Lutz, 1915

Species
- O. minuta Paramonov, 1954; O. bequaerti Maa, 1962; O. macleayi (Leach, 1817); O. phaneroneura Speiser, 1902

Genus of flies

Ortholfersia is a genus of biting flies in the family of louse flies, Hippoboscidae. There are 4 known species. All species are parasites of macropods.

== Distribution ==
Found in Australia, some species are very rare, because their hosts are endangered.

== Systematics ==
- Genus Ortholfersia Speiser, 1902

- Species group 'a'

- Ortholfersia minuta Paramonov, 1954

- Species group 'b'

- Ortholfersia bequaerti Maa, 1962
- Ortholfersia macleayi (Leach, 1817)
- Ortholfersia phaneroneura Speiser, 1902
