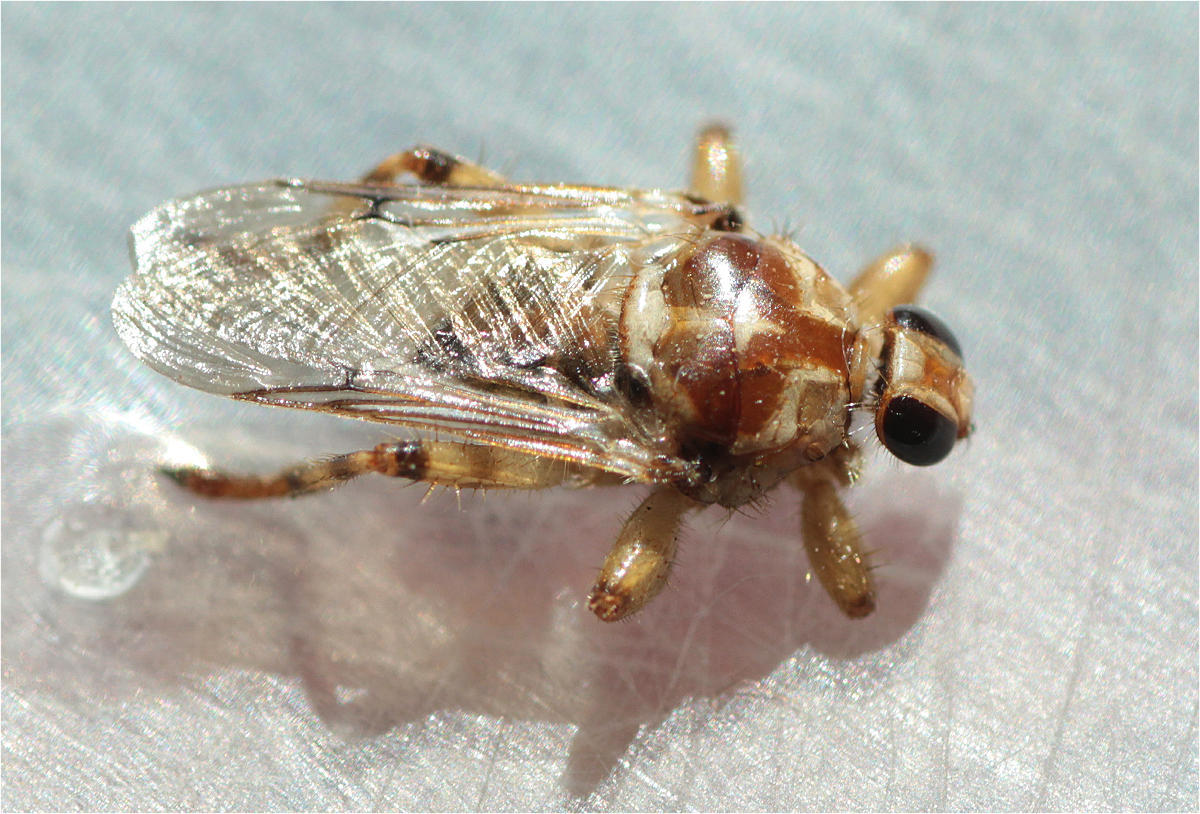
- Hippobosca longipennis

Scientific classification
- Kingdom: Animalia
- Phylum: Arthropoda
- Clade: Pancrustacea
- Class: Insecta
- Order: Diptera
- Family: Hippoboscidae
- Tribe: Hippoboscini
- Genus: Hippobosca
- Species: H. longipennis

Binomial name
- Hippobosca longipennis Fabricius, 1805

Synonyms
- Hippobosca canina Drensky, 1926; Hippobosca canina Rondani, 1878; Hippobosca capensis Olfers, 1816; Hippobosca chinensis Giglioli, 1864; Hippobosca fossulata Macquart, 1844; Hippobosca fracilloni Leach, 1817; Hippobosca orientalis Macquart, 1844; Ornithomyia chinensis Giglioli, 1864

= Hippobosca longipennis =

Species of fly

Hippobosca longipennis (Diptera: Hippoboscidae), the dog fly, louse fly, or blind fly, is a blood-feeding parasite mostly infesting carnivores. The species name "longipennis" means "long wings". Its bites can be painful and result in skin irritation, it is an intermediate host for the canine and hyaenid filarial parasite Dipetalonema dracunculoides, "and it may also be a biological or mechanical vector for other pathogens".

The species feeds on a variety of animals and have been known to bite people. During its lifetime, a female lays 10 to 15 larvae on a host. It has arrived in a few countries on zoo animals that were being transported from Africa. Studies have been completed on the flies. Some specimens have been found on ancient dog corpses in Greece and Egypt.

== Identification ==
The fly has a flat head and body, mouthparts that pierce and suck, veins are in the top half of its wings, and legs with tarsal claws. The species is related to sheep keds.

== Life cycle and feeding ==
Females of the species birth larvae, each one of them following the other. The larvae remains in their puparia which may allow them to survive intense changes to their environment. Between 19 days and 142 days after they leave their puparia, the adults come out in the morning to search for hosts to feed on. They feed on hosts multiple times each day, with the hosts including dogs that are fed on from their neck and their front armpit regions. After feeding off a host for a week, the flies begin to mate on the animal. The larvae develop inside the female from 3 to 8 days and then they are laid on soil, in cracks, underneath plants, or on top of debris. Soon after the cycle, the female continues to feed on the host until it starts another larval cycle. A female can live for around four to five months. During its lifetime, a female lays 10 to 15 larvae.

The species typically breeds on canines, Viverridae, hyenas, and felines. There have been reports of the species being on other animals, such as an ox in East Africa, but these records are considered to be rare occurrences. They usually feed on wild carnivores, but they have sometimes been found on domestic dogs. In a 1977 study, no specimen was known to have fed on a domestic cat. However, The Center for Food Security and Public Health states that they do feed on domestic cats. There were rare reports of the species biting people, with reports of those bites being painless or feeling like a sting from a bee. Other reports state that the bites can be painful to animals and can cause them to have irritated skin. Some cheetahs were observed to not put much effort into removing the parasites from their bodies.

In a 1978 study, it took an adult of the species around 8 minutes to finish a blood meal and they had to feed around every 6 hours. The flies starved the most in a moist atmosphere and the females starved less than the males. The study observed that their mating lasted for minutes. In a 1992 study, the species, along with Hippobosca equina, fed off of and reproduced on guinea pigs.

== Distribution ==
The species is found in Africa, the Middle East, Asia, and in areas throughout the Palearctic Region south of about 45° north latitude, and "is occasionally reported from countries on the fringes of this range", including Ireland, Germany, Poland, Japan, Sri Lanka and Taiwan. It has been transported into North America on several occasions with zoo animals. The species originally came from Africa. It entered the Americas multiple times, with the most serious incident occurring in 1970 when cheetahs were brought from East Africa to the San Diego Zoo. The flies were found on bat-eared foxes that were sent from Africa to North Carolina. Other incidents involved cheetahs in Ireland and Japan. Specimens were found inside dog corpses from ancient Greece and a specimen was found on an ancient Egyptian mummified dog.
