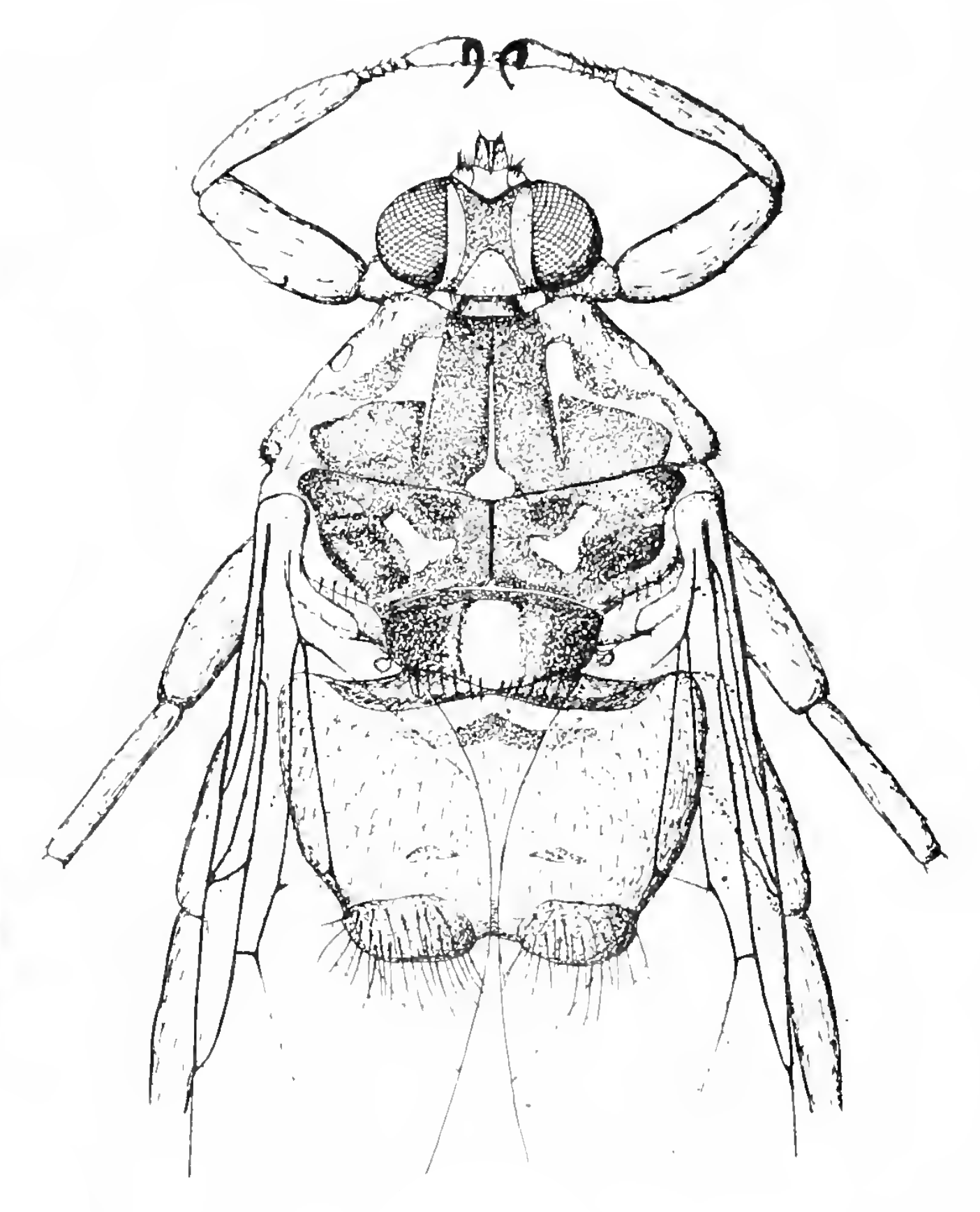

Scientific classification
- Kingdom: Animalia
- Phylum: Arthropoda
- Class: Insecta
- Order: Diptera
- Family: Hippoboscidae
- Tribe: Hippoboscini
- Genus: Hippobosca
- Species: H. camelina

Binomial name
- Hippobosca camelina Leach, 1817

Synonyms
- Hippobosca bactriana Rondani, 1878; Hippobosca dromedarina Speiser, 1902

= Hippobosca camelina =

Species of fly

Hippobosca camelina is a species of fly in the family Hippoboscidae.

== Distribution ==
Pakistan, Africa, West Asia.
