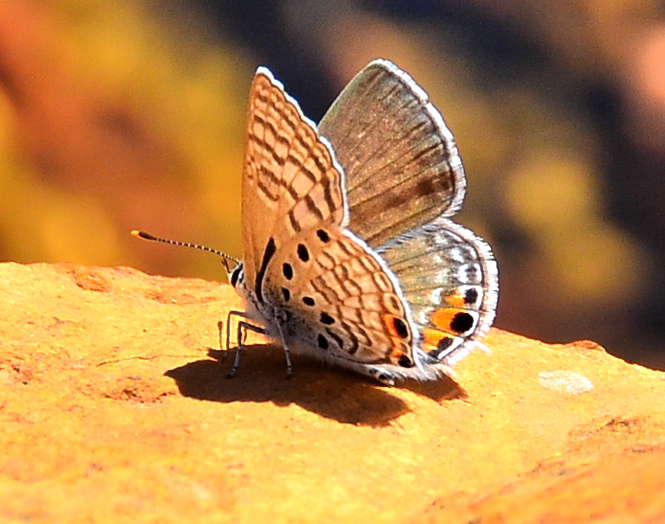

Conservation status
- Least Concern (IUCN 3.1)

Scientific classification
- Kingdom: Animalia
- Phylum: Arthropoda
- Clade: Pancrustacea
- Class: Insecta
- Order: Lepidoptera
- Family: Lycaenidae
- Genus: Anthene
- Species: A. amarah

Binomial name
- Anthene amarah (Guérin-Méneville, 1847)

Synonyms
- Polyommatus amarah Guérin-Méneville, 1847; Lampides olympusa Walker, 1870; Anthene amarah orphna Clench, 1965

= Anthene amarah =

Black-striped hairtail

Species of butterfly

Anthene amarah, the black-striped hairtail, leaden hairtail or leaden ciliate blue, is a butterfly of the family Lycaenidae. It is found in tropical Africa and Arabia (up to Aqaba). The habitat consists of savanna and occasionally open areas in the forest zone.

The wingspan is 21–26 mm for males and 23–29 mm for females. Adults are on wing year-round, with a peak in summer.

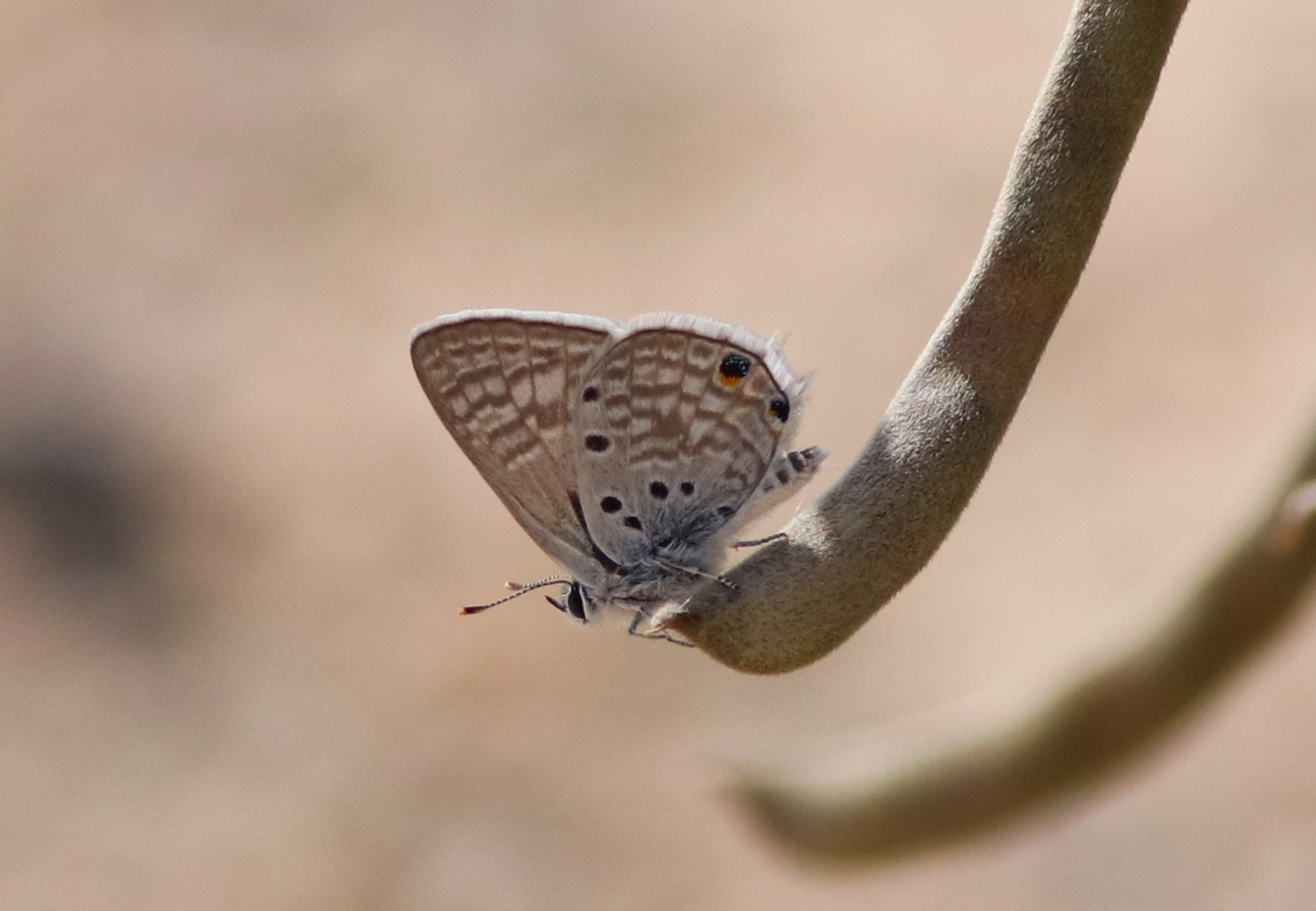
Anthene amarah from United Arab Emirates

The larvae feed on Acacia species, including and Acacia karroo, Acacia sieberana, and Vachellia gerrardi. They are associated with a number of ants, including Crematogaster bequaerti var. saga, Lepisiota affinis, Camponotus, and Myrmicaria species.

Torben Larsen developed a species numbering system for his 2005 publication Butterflies of West Africa. This species is #516. The 'Larsen' numbers have since been used with permission in A Sharp Eye on Butterflies of Ghana.
