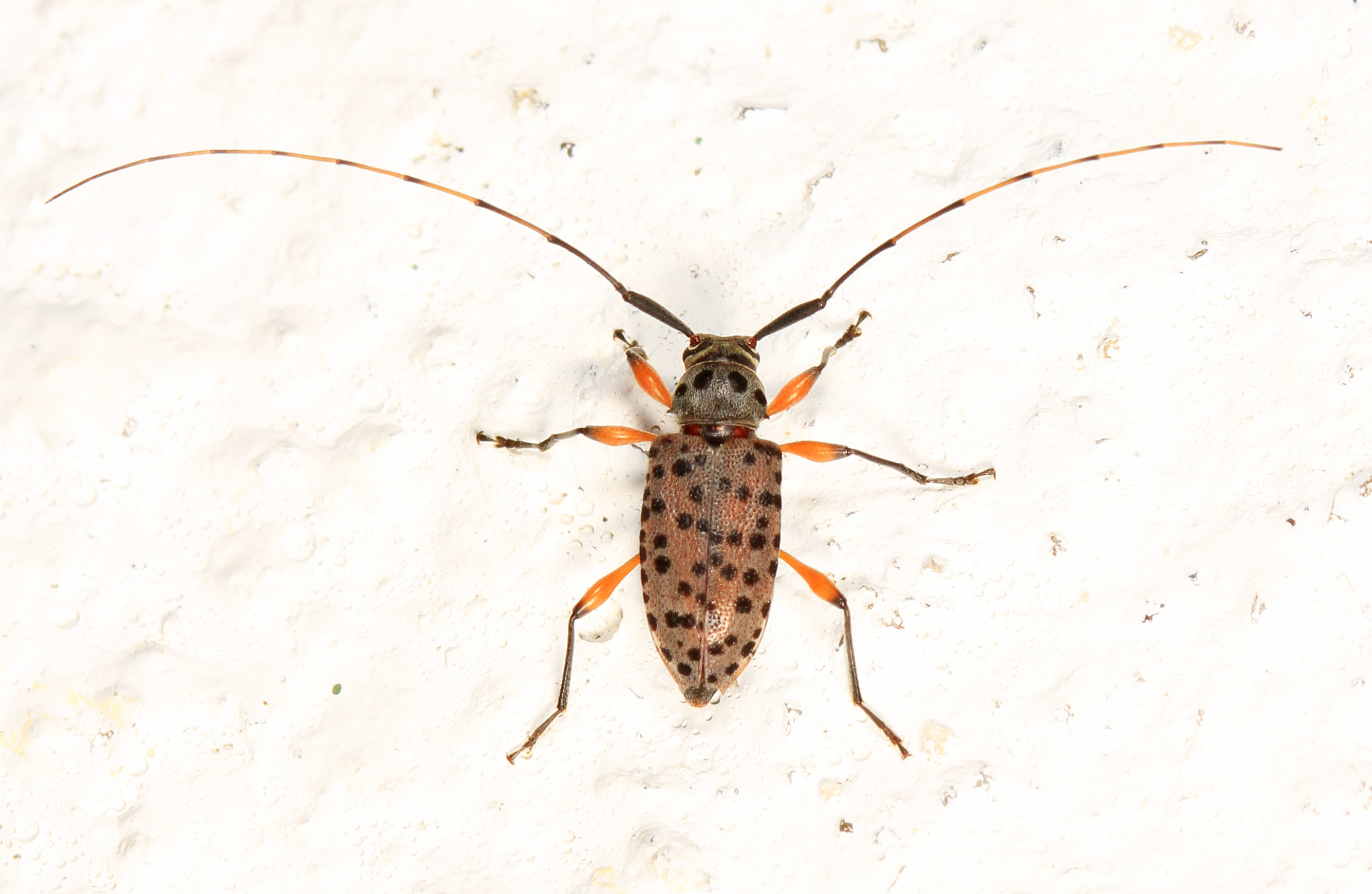

Scientific classification
- Kingdom: Animalia
- Phylum: Arthropoda
- Class: Insecta
- Order: Coleoptera
- Suborder: Polyphaga
- Infraorder: Cucujiformia
- Family: Cerambycidae
- Genus: Hyperplatys
- Species: H. aspersa

Binomial name
- Hyperplatys aspersa (Say, 1824)

= Hyperplatys aspersa =

Species of beetle

Hyperplatys aspersa is a species of longhorn beetles of the subfamily Lamiinae. It was described by Thomas Say in 1824.
