= Leucotabanus ambiguus =

Scientific classification
- Kingdom: Animalia
- Phylum: Arthropoda
- Class: Insecta
- Order: Diptera
- Family: Tabanidae
- Subfamily: Tabaninae
- Tribe: Diachlorini
- Genus: Leucotabanus
- Species: L. ambiguus

Binomial name
- Leucotabanus ambiguus Stone, 1938

Species of fly

Leucotabanus annulatus is a species of horse flies in the family Tabanidae. Larvae inhabit termite nests.

== Distribution ==
United States.
