= Struthiobosca =

Scientific classification
- Kingdom: Animalia
- Phylum: Arthropoda
- Clade: Pancrustacea
- Class: Insecta
- Order: Diptera
- Family: Hippoboscidae
- Subfamily: Hippoboscinae
- Genus: Struthiobosca; Maa, 1963
- Species: S. struthionis

Binomial name
- Struthiobosca struthionis (Janson, 1889)

Genus of flies

Struthiobosca is a genus of biting flies in the family of louse flies, Hippoboscidae. There is only one known species, Struthiobosca struthionis (Janson, 1889). It is a parasite of ostriches.

== Distribution ==
It is found in entire Southern Africa, Uganda, Tanzania, Kenya.

== Hosts ==
They are only found on ostrich (Struthio camelus).
