= Acarozumia matthewsi =

Scientific classification
- Domain: Eukaryota
- Kingdom: Animalia
- Phylum: Arthropoda
- Class: Insecta
- Order: Hymenoptera
- Family: Vespidae
- Genus: Acarozumia
- Species: A. matthewsi

Binomial name
- Acarozumia matthewsi Borsato, 1994

Species of wasp

Acarozumia matthewsi is a species of wasp in the family Vespidae. It was described by Borsato in 1994.
