= Zelandotipula novarae =

Scientific classification
- Kingdom: Animalia
- Phylum: Arthropoda
- Clade: Pancrustacea
- Class: Insecta
- Order: Diptera
- Family: Tipulidae
- Genus: Zelandotipula
- Species: Z. novarae

Binomial name
- Zelandotipula novarae (Schiner, 1868)

Synonyms
- Holorusia novarae (Schiner, 1868); Holorusia (Zelandotipula) novarae (Schiner, 1868); Tipula novarae Schiner, 1868; Tipula senex Butler, 1874; Zelandotipula senex (White & Butler, 1874)

Species of crane fly

Zelandotipula novarae, also known as the swamp crane fly, is a species of true crane fly in the family Tipulidae. It is endemic to New Zealand.

== Description ==
The species is brownish-yellow in colour, with four longitudinal stripes across the mesonotum. It is one of the largest species of crane fly in New Zealand, with a leg spread of over 7 cm (2.8 in). It can be differentiated from Zelandotipula fulva due to this species having significantly darker wings.

== Taxonomy ==
The species was first described as Tipula novarae by Ignaz Rudolph Schiner in 1868. In 1922, Charles Paul Alexander described Zelandotipula as a subgenus of Holorusia, naming Z. novarae as the type species. Zelandotipula was elevated to genus level in 1968 by Richard Irwin Vane-Wright, leading to the species' current accepted name Zelandotipula novarae.

Genetically, the species is closely related to Zelandotipula otagana.

== Distribution and habitat ==
The species is endemic to New Zealand, found in the North Island, and South Island as far south as Dunedin.

== Gallery ==
Close-up of Z. novarae

Specimen of Z. novarae

Mating pair
