= Hyperplatys griseomaculata =

Scientific classification
- Kingdom: Animalia
- Phylum: Arthropoda
- Class: Insecta
- Order: Coleoptera
- Suborder: Polyphaga
- Infraorder: Cucujiformia
- Family: Cerambycidae
- Genus: Hyperplatys
- Species: H. griseomaculata

Binomial name
- Hyperplatys griseomaculata Fisher, 1926

Species of beetle

Hyperplatys griseomaculata is a species of longhorn beetles of the subfamily Lamiinae. It was described by Fisher in 1926, and is known from Trinidad.
