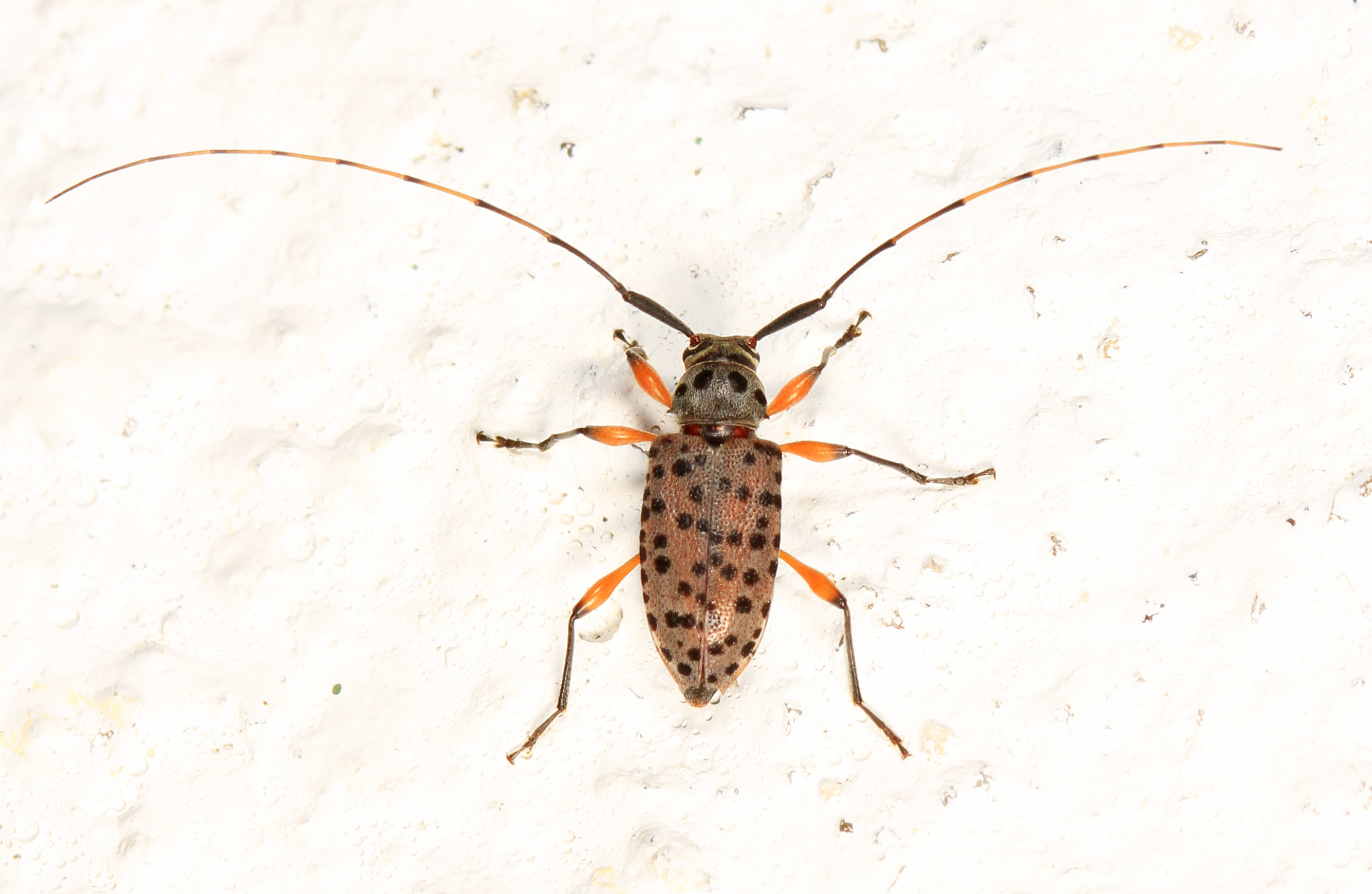
- Day 163 - Longhorn Beetle - Hyperplatys aspersa.

Scientific classification
- Kingdom: Animalia
- Phylum: Arthropoda
- Clade: Pancrustacea
- Class: Insecta
- Order: Coleoptera
- Suborder: Polyphaga
- Infraorder: Cucujiformia
- Family: Cerambycidae
- Tribe: Acanthocinini
- Genus: Hyperplatys; Haldeman, 1847

= Hyperplatys =

Genus of beetles

Hyperplatys is a genus of longhorn beetles of the subfamily Lamiinae. It was described by Haldeman in 1847.

== Species ==
- Hyperplatys argus (Bates, 1872)
- Hyperplatys aspersa (Say, 1824)
- Hyperplatys californica Casey, 1892
- Hyperplatys canus (Bates, 1863)
- Hyperplatys convexus (Melzer, 1934)
- Hyperplatys femoralis Haldeman, 1847
- Hyperplatys griseomaculata Fisher, 1926
- Hyperplatys maculata Haldeman, 1847
- Hyperplatys montana Casey, 1913
- Hyperplatys pardalis (Bates, 1881)
- Hyperplatys pusillus (Bates, 1863

== Selected former species ==
- Hyperplatys argentinus (Berg, 1889)
