= Haplonerita simplex =

Scientific classification
- Domain: Eukaryota
- Kingdom: Animalia
- Phylum: Arthropoda
- Class: Insecta
- Order: Lepidoptera
- Superfamily: Noctuoidea
- Family: Erebidae
- Subfamily: Arctiinae
- Genus: Haplonerita
- Species: H. simplex

Binomial name
- Haplonerita simplex (Rothschild, 1909)

Synonyms
- Idalus simplex Rothschild, 1909

Species of moth

Haplonerita simplex is a moth of the family Erebidae first described by Walter Rothschild in 1909. It is found in French Guiana, Suriname, Venezuela and Peru.
