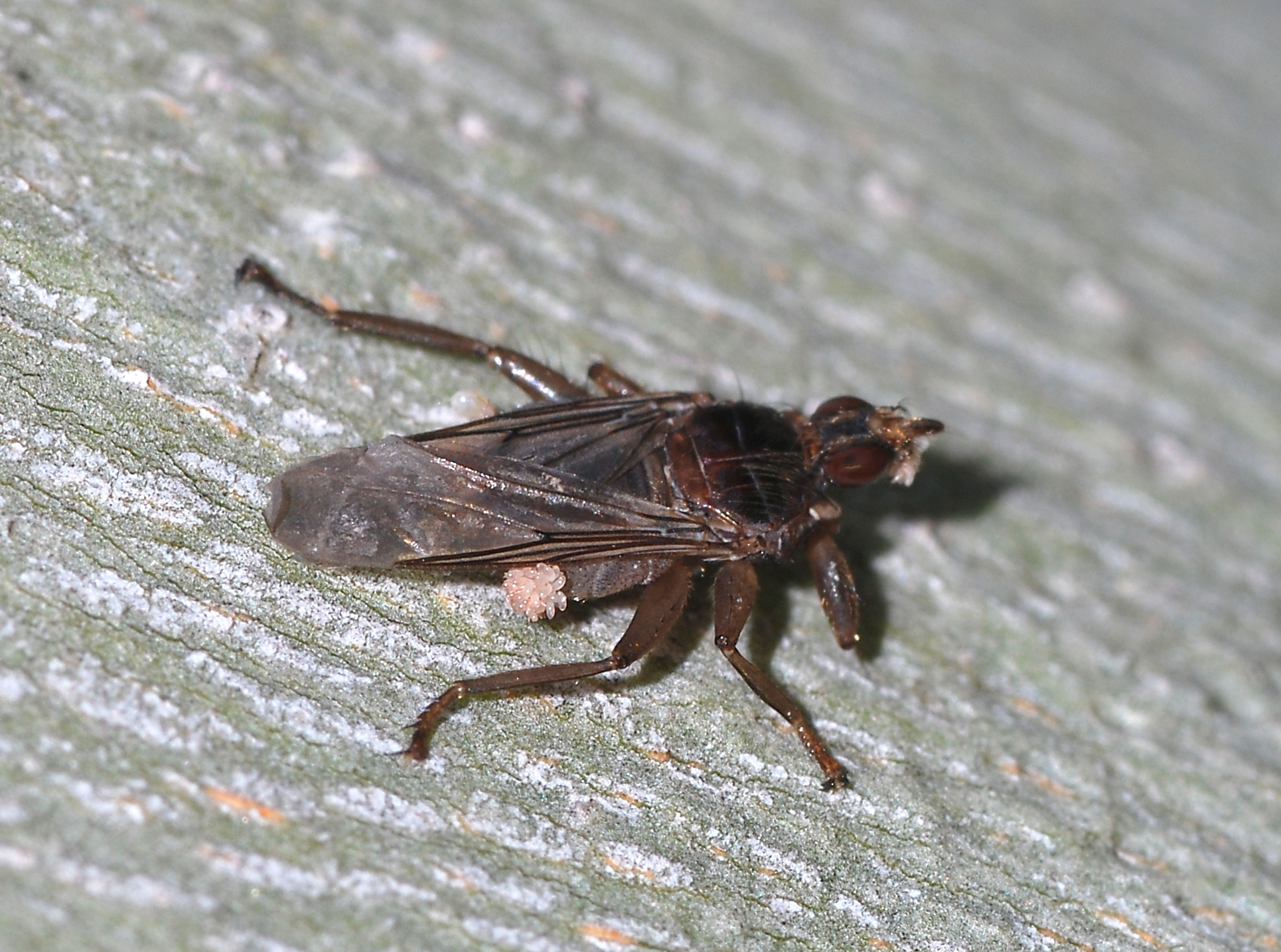
- Pseudolynchia canariensis

Scientific classification
- Kingdom: Animalia
- Phylum: Arthropoda
- Class: Insecta
- Order: Diptera
- Superfamily: Hippoboscoidea
- Family: Hippoboscidae
- Subfamily: Ornithomyinae
- Genus: Pseudolynchia; Bequaert, 1926

Type species
- Olfersia maura Bigot, 1885

= Pseudolynchia =

Genus of flies

Pseudolynchia are genus of biting flies in the family of louse flies, Hippoboscidae. There are 5 known species. One of the more well known species is the pigeon louse fly Pseudolynchia canariensis. All species are parasites of birds.

== Systematics ==
- Genus Pseudolynchia Bequaert, 1926

- Species group 'a'

- P. serratipes Maa, 1966

- Species group 'b'

- P. brunnea (Latreille, 1812)
- P. canariensis (Macquart, 1840)
- P. garzettae (Rondani, 1879)
- P. mistula Maa, 1969
