= Hyperplatys pardalis =

Scientific classification
- Kingdom: Animalia
- Phylum: Arthropoda
- Class: Insecta
- Order: Coleoptera
- Suborder: Polyphaga
- Infraorder: Cucujiformia
- Family: Cerambycidae
- Genus: Hyperplatys
- Species: H. pardalis

Binomial name
- Hyperplatys pardalis (Bates, 1881)

Species of beetle

Hyperplatys pardalis is a species of longhorn beetles of the subfamily Lamiinae. It was described by Henry Walter Bates in 1881, and is known from western Mexico to Guatemala, and Honduras.
