= Hippobosca hirsuta =

Scientific classification
- Kingdom: Animalia
- Phylum: Arthropoda
- Class: Insecta
- Order: Diptera
- Family: Hippoboscidae
- Tribe: Hippoboscini
- Genus: Hippobosca
- Species: H. hirsuta

Binomial name
- Hippobosca hirsuta Austen, 1911

Synonyms
- Hippobosca neavei Austen, 1911

Species of fly

Hippobosca hirsuta is a species of fly in the family Hippoboscidae.

== Distribution ==
Uganda.
