= Hyperplatys pusillus =

Scientific classification
- Kingdom: Animalia
- Phylum: Arthropoda
- Class: Insecta
- Order: Coleoptera
- Suborder: Polyphaga
- Infraorder: Cucujiformia
- Family: Cerambycidae
- Genus: Hyperplatys
- Species: H. pusillus

Binomial name
- Hyperplatys pusillus (Bates, 1863)

Species of beetle

Hyperplatys pusillus is a species of longhorn beetles of the subfamily Lamiinae. It was described by Henry Walter Bates in 1863, and is known from southwestern Mexico to Panama.

== Subspecies ==
- Hyperplatys pusillus pusillus (Bates, 1863)
- Hyperplatys pusillus nigrisparsus (Bates, 1885)
