= Hyperplatys californica =

Scientific classification
- Kingdom: Animalia
- Phylum: Arthropoda
- Class: Insecta
- Order: Coleoptera
- Suborder: Polyphaga
- Infraorder: Cucujiformia
- Family: Cerambycidae
- Genus: Hyperplatys
- Species: H. californica

Binomial name
- Hyperplatys californica Casey, 1892

Species of beetle

Hyperplatys californica is a species of longhorn beetles of the subfamily Lamiinae. It was described by Casey in 1892.
