= Acarozumia nigroflava =

Scientific classification
- Domain: Eukaryota
- Kingdom: Animalia
- Phylum: Arthropoda
- Class: Insecta
- Order: Hymenoptera
- Family: Vespidae
- Genus: Acarozumia
- Species: A. nigroflava

Binomial name
- Acarozumia nigroflava Borsato & Giordani Soika, 1995

Species of wasp

Acarozumia nigroflava is a species of wasp in the family Vespidae. It was described by Borsato and Giordani Soika in 1995.
