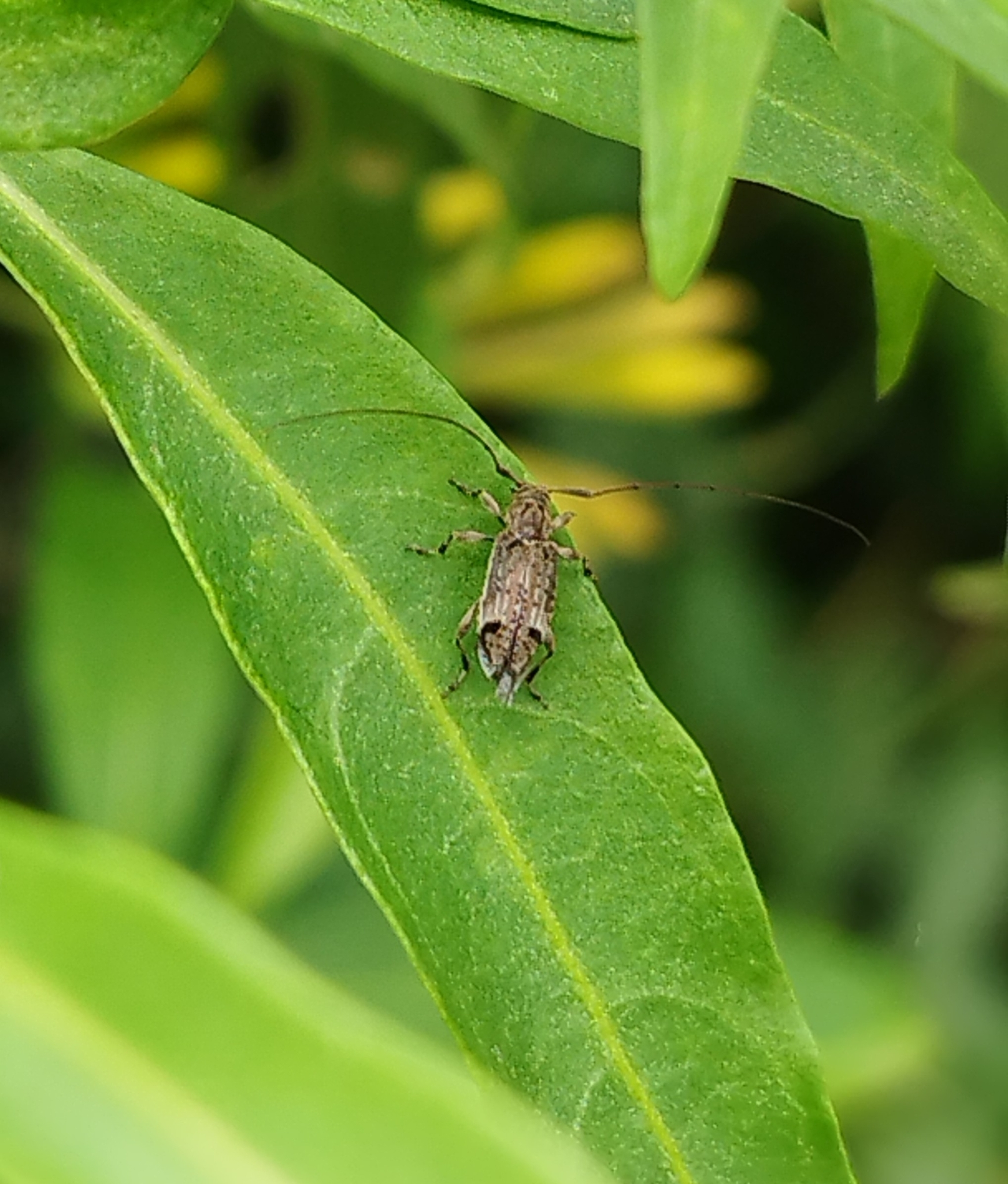

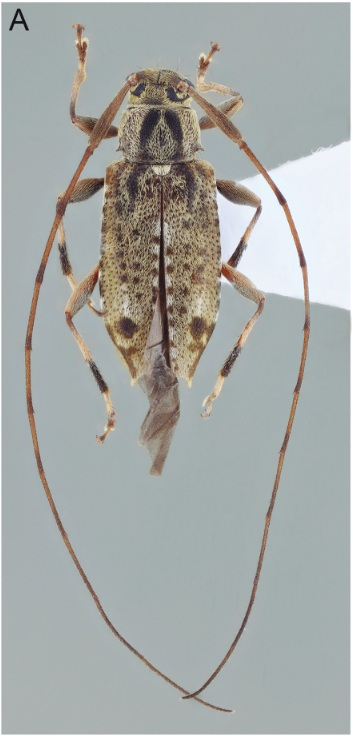

Scientific classification
- Kingdom: Animalia
- Phylum: Arthropoda
- Clade: Pancrustacea
- Class: Insecta
- Order: Coleoptera
- Suborder: Polyphaga
- Infraorder: Cucujiformia
- Family: Cerambycidae
- Genus: Hyperplatys
- Species: H. canus

Binomial name
- Hyperplatys canus (Henry Walter Bates, 1863)

Synonyms
- Hyperplatys spinipennis Fisher, 1938; Hyperplatys argentinus Berg, 1889

= Hyperplatys canus =

Species of beetle

Hyperplatys canus is a species of longhorn beetle of the subfamily Lamiinae. It was described by Carlos Berg in 1889 and is known from Argentina and Uruguay. It is found in Brazil (Minas Gerais, Rio de Janeiro, São Paulo, Paraná, Santa Catarina, Rio Grande do Sul), Argentina, Paraguay and Uruguay.
