= Proparabosca =

Scientific classification
- Kingdom: Animalia
- Phylum: Arthropoda
- Clade: Pancrustacea
- Class: Insecta
- Order: Diptera
- Family: Hippoboscidae
- Subfamily: Ornithomyinae
- Genus: Proparabosca; Maa, 1963
- Species: P. alata

Binomial name
- Proparabosca alata Theodor & Oldroyd, 1965

Genus of flies

Proparabosca is a genus of biting flies in the family of louse flies, Hippoboscidae. There is only one known species, Proparabosca alata (Theodor & Oldroyd, 1965). It is a parasite of lemurs.

== Distribution ==
It is found in Namoroka National Park in Madagascar.

== Hosts ==
They are only found on Verreaux's sifaka (Propithecus verreauxi).
