= Haplonerita =

Scientific classification
- Kingdom: Animalia
- Phylum: Arthropoda
- Class: Insecta
- Order: Lepidoptera
- Superfamily: Noctuoidea
- Family: Erebidae
- Subfamily: Arctiinae
- Subtribe: Phaegopterina
- Genus: Haplonerita; Hampson, 1911

Type species
- Idalus simplex Rothschild, 1909

Genus of moths

Haplonerita is a genus of moths in the family Erebidae. It was first described by Walter Rothschild in 1909. The genus was erected by George Hampson in 1911.

== Species ==
- Haplonerita maculata Toulgoët, 1988
- Haplonerita simplex (Rothschild, 1909)
