= Hippobosca variegata =

Scientific classification
- Kingdom: Animalia
- Phylum: Arthropoda
- Class: Insecta
- Order: Diptera
- Family: Hippoboscidae
- Tribe: Hippoboscini
- Genus: Hippobosca
- Species: H. variegata

Binomial name
- Hippobosca variegata Megerle, 1803

Synonyms
- Hippobosca aegyptiaca var. bengalensis Ormerod, 1895; Hippobosca bipartita Macquart, 1844; Hippobosca calopsis Bigot, 1885; Hippobosca egyptiaca Macquart, 1844; Hippobosca maculata Leach, 1817; Hippobosca oegyptiaca Macquart, 1844; Hippobosca sivae Bigot, 1885; Hippobosca sudanica Bigot, 1885; Hippobosca variegata Wiedemann, 1830

Species of fly

Hippobosca variegata is a species of fly in the family Hippoboscidae.

== Distribution ==
Europe, Iraq, Egypt, Oriental & Afrotoropical.
