= Hyperplatys convexus =

Scientific classification
- Kingdom: Animalia
- Phylum: Arthropoda
- Clade: Pancrustacea
- Class: Insecta
- Order: Coleoptera
- Suborder: Polyphaga
- Infraorder: Cucujiformia
- Family: Cerambycidae
- Genus: Hyperplatys
- Species: H. convexus

Binomial name
- Hyperplatys convexus (Melzer, 1934)

Synonyms
- Leiopus convexus Melzer, 1934

Species of beetle

Hyperplatys convexus is a species of beetle of the family Cerambycidae. It is found in Brazil (Minas Gerais, Espírito Santo, Rio de Janeiro, São Paulo, Paraná, Santa Catarina, Rio Grande do Sul) and Paraguay.
