= Acarozumia amaliae =

Scientific classification
- Domain: Eukaryota
- Kingdom: Animalia
- Phylum: Arthropoda
- Class: Insecta
- Order: Hymenoptera
- Family: Vespidae
- Genus: Acarozumia
- Species: A. amaliae

Binomial name
- Acarozumia amaliae (Saussure, 1869)

Species of wasp

Acarozumia amaliae is a species of wasp in the family Vespidae. It was described by Saussure in 1869.
