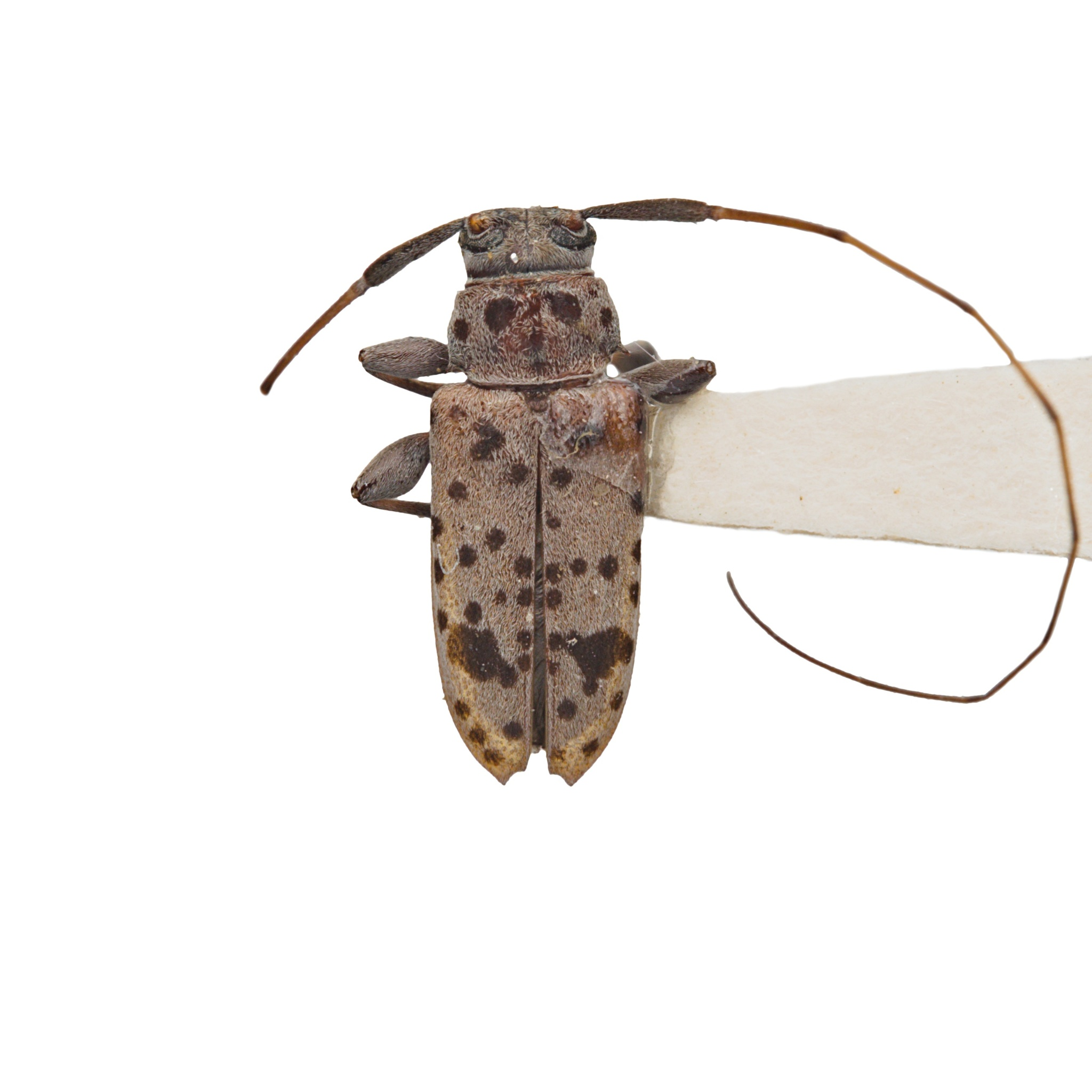

Scientific classification
- Kingdom: Animalia
- Phylum: Arthropoda
- Class: Insecta
- Order: Coleoptera
- Suborder: Polyphaga
- Infraorder: Cucujiformia
- Family: Cerambycidae
- Genus: Hyperplatys
- Species: H. montana

Binomial name
- Hyperplatys montana Casey, 1913

= Hyperplatys montana =

Species of beetle

Hyperplatys montana is a species of longhorn beetles of the subfamily Lamiinae. It was described by Casey in 1913, and is known from the southwestern United States.
