= Hippobosca fulva =

Scientific classification
- Kingdom: Animalia
- Phylum: Arthropoda
- Class: Insecta
- Order: Diptera
- Family: Hippoboscidae
- Tribe: Hippoboscini
- Genus: Hippobosca
- Species: H. fulva

Binomial name
- Hippobosca fulva Austen, 1912

Species of fly

Hippobosca fulva is a species of fly in the family Hippoboscidae.

== Distribution ==
Mozambique, South Africa, Eswatini, Tanzania.
