= Hyperplatys argus =

Scientific classification
- Kingdom: Animalia
- Phylum: Arthropoda
- Class: Insecta
- Order: Coleoptera
- Suborder: Polyphaga
- Infraorder: Cucujiformia
- Family: Cerambycidae
- Genus: Hyperplatys
- Species: H. argus

Binomial name
- Hyperplatys argus (Bates, 1872)

Species of beetle

Hyperplatys argus is a species of longhorn beetles of the subfamily Lamiinae. It was described by Bates in 1872, and is known from Nicaragua Panama, and eastern Ecuador.
