= Hyperplatys femoralis =

Scientific classification
- Kingdom: Animalia
- Phylum: Arthropoda
- Class: Insecta
- Order: Coleoptera
- Suborder: Polyphaga
- Infraorder: Cucujiformia
- Family: Cerambycidae
- Genus: Hyperplatys
- Species: H. femoralis

Binomial name
- Hyperplatys femoralis Haldeman, 1847

Species of beetle

Hyperplatys femoralis is a species of longhorn beetles of the subfamily Lamiinae. It was described by Haldeman in 1847.
