= Hippobosca rufipes =

Scientific classification
- Kingdom: Animalia
- Phylum: Arthropoda
- Class: Insecta
- Order: Diptera
- Family: Hippoboscidae
- Genus: Hippobosca
- Species: H. rufipes

Binomial name
- Hippobosca rufipes von Olfers, 1816

Synonyms
- Hippobosca albomaculata Macquart, 1855; Hippobosca albonotata Rondani, 1863; Hippobosca camelopardalis Roubaud, 1925; Hippobosca maculata Macquart, 1835; Hippobosca wahlenbergiana Jaennicke, 1867

Species of fly

Hippobosca rufipes is a species of fly in the family Hippoboscidae. It is found in southern Africa.
