= Haplonerita maculata =

Scientific classification
- Kingdom: Animalia
- Phylum: Arthropoda
- Class: Insecta
- Order: Lepidoptera
- Superfamily: Noctuoidea
- Family: Erebidae
- Subfamily: Arctiinae
- Genus: Haplonerita
- Species: H. maculata

Binomial name
- Haplonerita maculata Toulgoët, 1988

Species of moth

Haplonerita maculata is a moth of the family Erebidae first described by Hervé de Toulgoët in 1988. It is found in Venezuela.
