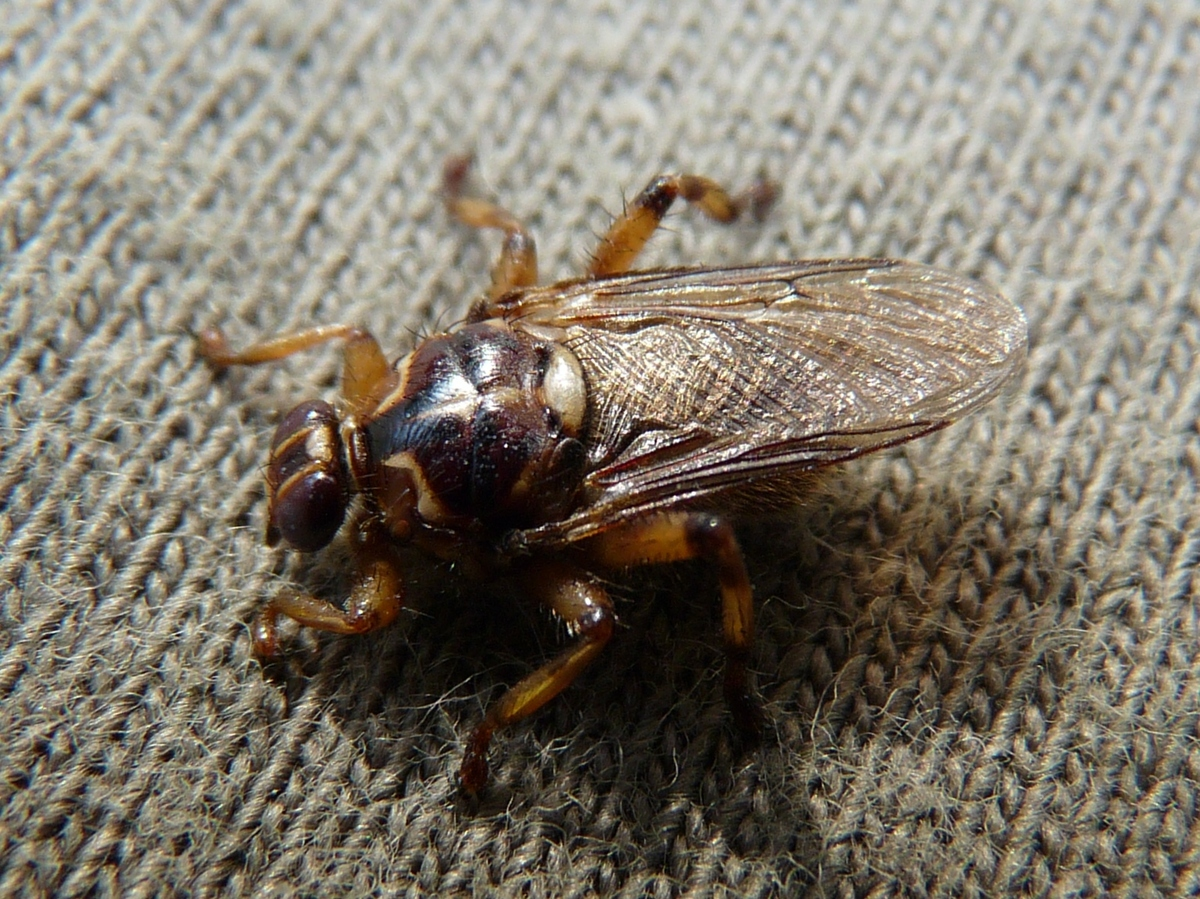
- Hippobosca equina

Scientific classification
- Kingdom: Animalia
- Phylum: Arthropoda
- Clade: Pancrustacea
- Class: Insecta
- Order: Diptera
- Family: Hippoboscidae
- Tribe: Hippoboscini
- Genus: Hippobosca; Linnaeus, 1758

Type species
- Hippobosca equina Linnaeus, 1758

Species
- See text.

Synonyms
- Hippoboscus Gray, 1832; Hyppobosca Guerin, 1831; Nirmomyia Nitzsch, 1818; Zoomyia Bigot, 1885

= Hippobosca =

Genus of flies

Hippobosca is a genus of flies in the family Hippoboscidae, with seven known species. There are numerous synonyms.

== Distribution ==
The primary distribution of Hippobosca is in Europe and parts of Asia and Africa. It has been introduced to other locations, although in some cases it has been later eradicated by modern husbandry practices.

== Species ==
- Genus Hippobosca Linnaeus, 1758

- Species group 'a'

- Hippobosca equina Linnaeus, 1758
- Hippobosca fulva Austen, 1912
- Hippobosca longipennis Fabricius, 1805

- Species group 'b'

- Hippobosca camelina Leach, 1817

- Species group 'c'

- Hippobosca hirsuta Austen, 1911
- Hippobosca rufipes von Olfers, 1816
- Hippobosca variegata Megerle, 1803
