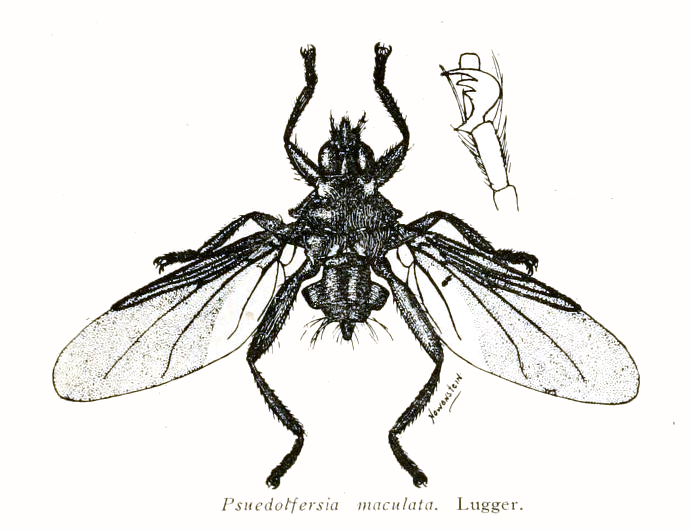
- Olfersia fumipennis

Scientific classification
- Kingdom: Animalia
- Phylum: Arthropoda
- Class: Insecta
- Order: Diptera
- Family: Hippoboscidae
- Subfamily: Ornithomyinae
- Genus: Olfersia; Leach, 1817

Species
- See text

Synonyms
- Pseudolfersia Coquillett, 1899

= Olfersia (fly) =

Genus of flies

Olfersia is a genus of biting flies in the family of louse flies, Hippoboscidae. The genus was erected by William Elford Leach in 1817. There are seven known species, and all are parasites of birds.

== Distribution ==
Olfersia are found worldwide with the exception of Australia, but are most abundant in North and Central America.

== Systematics ==
- Genus Olfersia Leach, 1817

- Species group 'a'

- O. sordida Bigot, 1885

- Species group 'b'

- O. bisulcata Macquart, 1847
- O. fossulata Macquart, 1843
- O. fumipennis (J. Sahlberg, 1886)

- Species group 'c'

- O. aenescens C. G. Thompson, 1869
- O. spinifera (Leach, 1817)

- Species group 'd'

- O. coriacea van der Wulp, 1903
