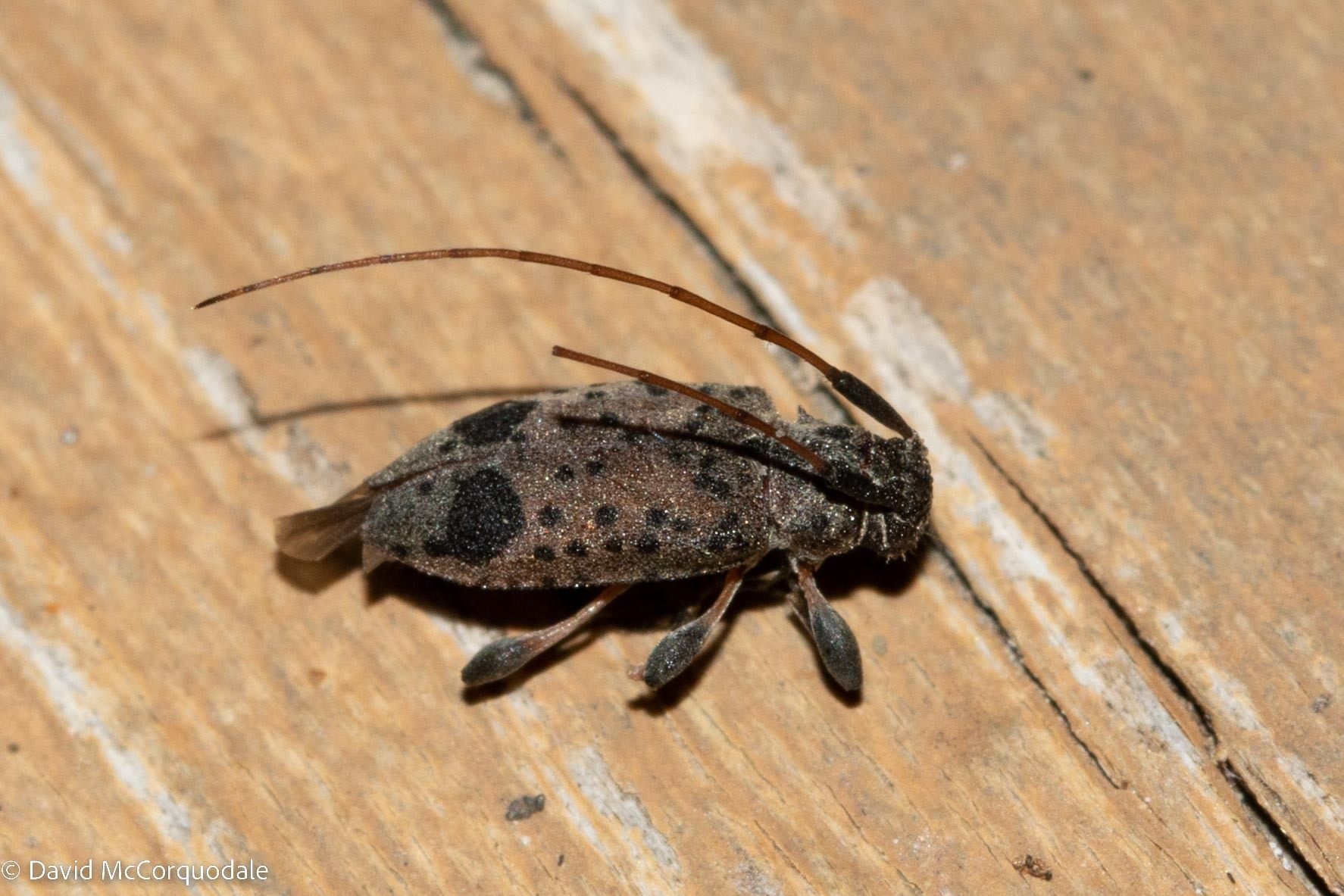

Scientific classification
- Kingdom: Animalia
- Phylum: Arthropoda
- Class: Insecta
- Order: Coleoptera
- Suborder: Polyphaga
- Infraorder: Cucujiformia
- Family: Cerambycidae
- Genus: Hyperplatys
- Species: H. maculata

Binomial name
- Hyperplatys maculata Haldeman, 1847

= Hyperplatys maculata =

Species of beetle

Hyperplatys maculata is a species of longhorn beetles of the subfamily Lamiinae. It was described by Haldeman in 1847.
