= Hippobosca equina =

Scientific classification
- Kingdom: Animalia
- Phylum: Arthropoda
- Clade: Pancrustacea
- Class: Insecta
- Order: Diptera
- Family: Hippoboscidae
- Tribe: Hippoboscini
- Genus: Hippobosca
- Species: H. equina

Binomial name
- Hippobosca equina Linnaeus, 1758

Synonyms
- Hippobosca equi Macquart, 1835; Hippobosca taurina Rondani, 1879

Species of fly

Hippobosca equina, also known as the forest fly or New Forest fly, is a biting fly from the family Hippoboscidae. They are blood-feeding ectoparasites of primarily horses and other large mammals including cattle. It is a permanently fully winged fly, not shedding its wings on finding its host, as in some other Hippoboscidae. With its wings retained, it may thus fly away from its host to deposit its larvae. They are good fliers.

== Description ==
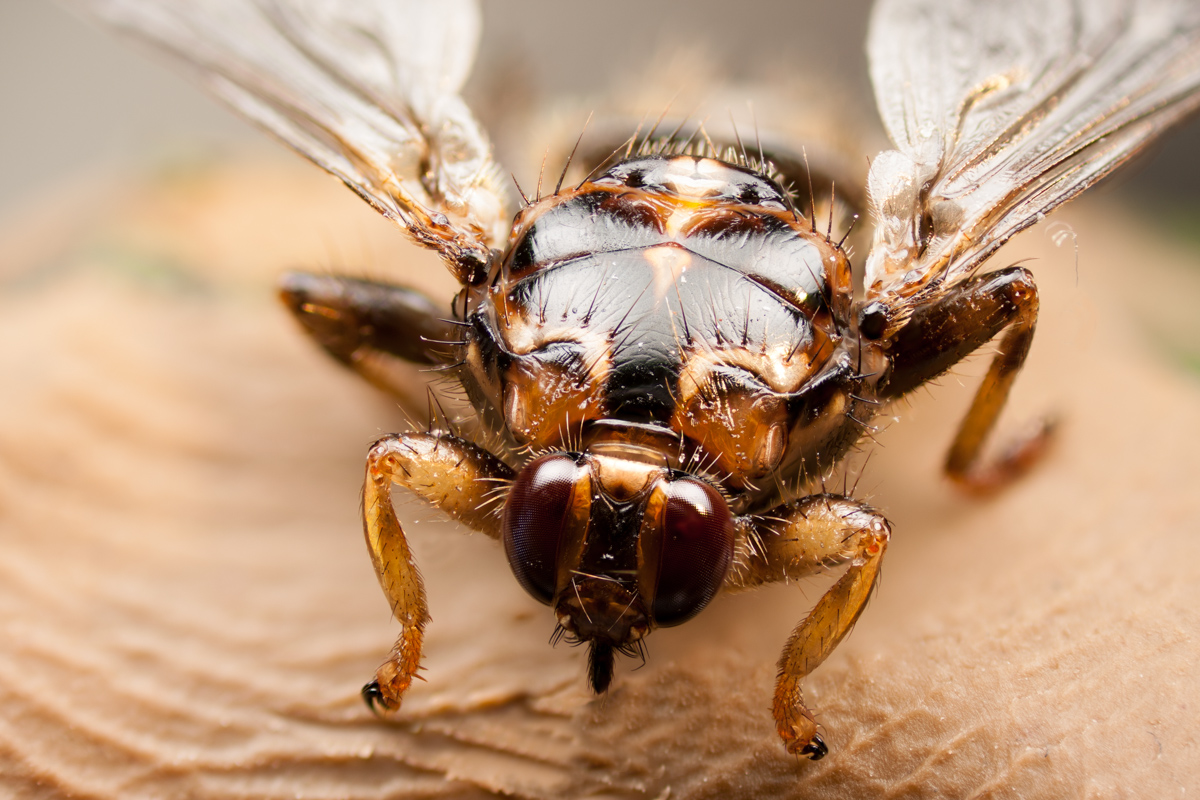

Wing length 6.0–8.5 millimetres (0.24–0.33 in). Generally pale reddish brown with yellow spots on the indistinctly segmented abdomen. They have one pair of sub-triangular wings and the wing veins are crowded together towards the anterior border. The characteristic feature of these flies is that they move sidewards and they feed preferably between the hind legs and on the perineum region.

== Life cycle ==
The New Forest fly lays larvae singly in late instar (stage III). They rapidly pupate over one hour and exhibit varying duration as pupae, depending on temperature.

== Distribution ==
The primary distribution is in Europe and parts of Asia and Africa. It has been introduced to other locations, though in some cases latter eradicated by modern husbandry practices. In the United Kingdom they are known primarily from the New Forest and increasingly from South Devon. There are occasionally recorded from other part of the UK, though some reports as far north as the Scottish borders are considered dubious. In the United Kingdom, their flight period is from May to October, but peaking August and early September. Within Egypt, the fly is most prevalent in Lower Egypt and appears to be responsive to temperature and humidity, being most common in June, July and August.

== Hosts ==
Their primary host are equines; they are often also frequently found on cattle on which they are able to maintain a population. They have been known to bite a number of other mammals, including humans, in whom this may lead to anaphylactic reactions. Other mammals it may also live on are red deer, camel and rabbit. Also on birds: the grey heron, and the northern goshawk. They have been fed and bred on guinea pigs in the laboratory.

== As a disease vector ==
Hippobosca equina has been implicated in transmission of Corynebacterium pseudotuberculosis between water buffalo in Egypt, causing edematous skin disease. The transmission has been reported to be biological with transovarial transmission.
