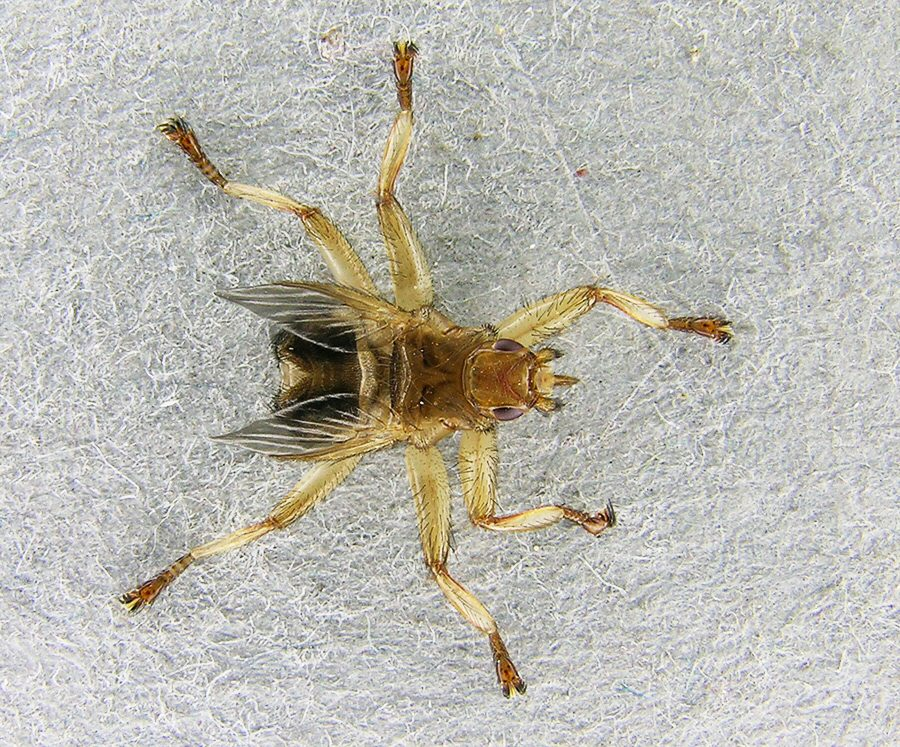
- The flightless Crataerina pallida

Scientific classification
- Kingdom: Animalia
- Phylum: Arthropoda
- Clade: Pancrustacea
- Class: Insecta
- Order: Diptera
- Clade: Eremoneura
- Clade: Cyclorrhapha
- Section: Schizophora
- Subsection: Calyptratae
- Superfamily: Hippoboscoidea
- Family: Hippoboscidae; Samouelle, 1819

Subfamilies
- Ornithomyinae; Hippoboscinae; Lipopteninae

Synonyms
- Hypoboscidae (lapsus)

= Hippoboscidae =

Family of insects (louse flies/keds)

Hippoboscidae, the louse flies or keds, are obligate parasites of mammals and birds. In this family, the winged species can fly at least reasonably well, though others with vestigial or no wings are flightless and highly apomorphic. As usual in their superfamily Hippoboscoidea, most of the larval development takes place within the mother's body, and pupation occurs almost immediately.

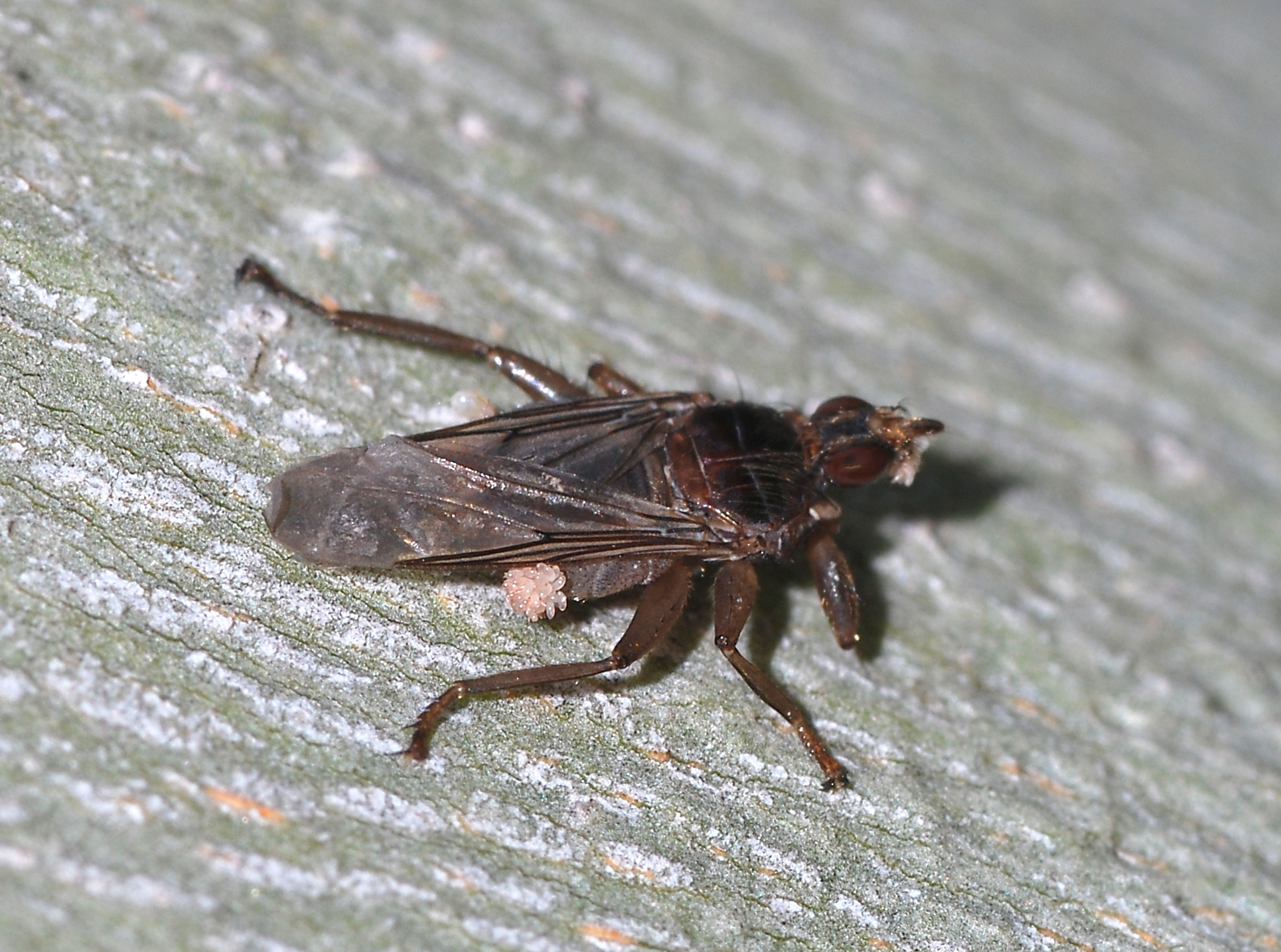
The winged Pseudolynchia canariensis

The sheep ked, Melophagus ovinus, is a wingless, reddish-brown fly that parasitizes sheep. The Neotropical deer ked, Lipoptena mazamae, is a common ectoparasite of white-tailed deer (Odocoileus virginianus) in the southeastern United States. Both winged and wingless forms may be seen. A common winged species is the forest fly (Hippobosca equina), which often parasitizes horses. Species in other genera are found on birds; for example, Ornithomya bequaerti has been collected from birds in Alaska. Two species of the Hippoboscidae – Ornithoica (Ornithoica) podargi and Ornithomya fuscipennis are also common parasites of the tawny frogmouth (Podargus strigoides) of Australia.

Pseudolynchia canariensis is commonly found on pigeons and doves, and can serve as the vector of "pigeon malaria". Louse flies of birds may transmit other parasites such as those in the genus Plasmodium or other Haemoproteus parasites. Some evidence indicates that other Hippoboscidae can serve as vectors of disease agents to mammals. For example, a louse fly of the species Icosta americana was found with West Nile Virus infection from an American Kestrel.

== Systematics ==
In some obsolete taxonomies, the name Hippoboscidae is applied to the group properly known as Pupipara, i.e. the present family plus the bat flies (Nycteribiidae and "Streblidae"). They are called pupipara because the females birth live young, one at a time, that are deposited as late stage larvae called a prepuparium that pupate immediately at birth. For the species Pseudolynchia canariensis, as well as other louse flies, reproduction is energetically expensive. Larvae feed on milk glands within the female fly prior to being deposited. Single offspring (pupae) can weigh more than an unfed emerged adult fly since the pupal casing is included in the pupal weight and teneral flies often put on mass after their first few blood meals. Two of the three traditional subfamilies (Hippoboscinae and Lipopteninae) have been shown to be good monophyletic groups at least overall. According to cladistic analysis of several DNA sequences, to make the Ornithomyinae monophyletic, their tribe Olfersini deserves to be recognized as a full family, too.

- Subfamily Ornithomyinae Bigot, 1853

- Genus Allobosca Speiser, 1899 (1 species)
- Genus Austrolfersia Bequaert, 1953 (1 species)
- Genus Crataerina von Olfers, 1816 (8 species)
- Genus Icosta Speiser, 1905 (52 species)
- Genus Microlynchia Lutz, 1915 (4 species)
- Genus Myophthiria Rondani, 1875 (13 species)
- Genus Olfersia Leach, 1817 (7 species)
- Genus Ornithoctona Speiser, 1902 (12 species)
- Genus Ornithoica Rondani, 1878 (24 species)
- Genus Ornithomya Latreille, 1802 (29 species)
- Genus Ornithophila Rondani, 1879 (2 species)
- Genus Ortholfersia Speiser, 1902 (4 species)
- Genus Phthona Maa, 1969 (3 species)
- Genus Proparabosca Theodor & Oldroyd 1965 (1 species)
- Genus Pseudolynchia Bequaert, 1926 (5 species)
- Genus Stilbometopa Coquillett, 1899 (5 species)

- Subfamily Hippoboscinae

- Genus Hippobosca Linnaeus, 1758 (7 species)
- Genus Struthiobosca Maa, 1963 (1 species)

- Subfamily Lipopteninae

- Genus Lipoptena Nitzsch, 1818 (30 species)
- Genus Melophagus Latreille, 1802 (3 species)
- Genus Neolipoptena Bequaert, 1942 (1 species)

== See also ==
- Ked itch
- Use of DNA in forensic entomology
