= Joseph Charles Bequaert =

American naturalist

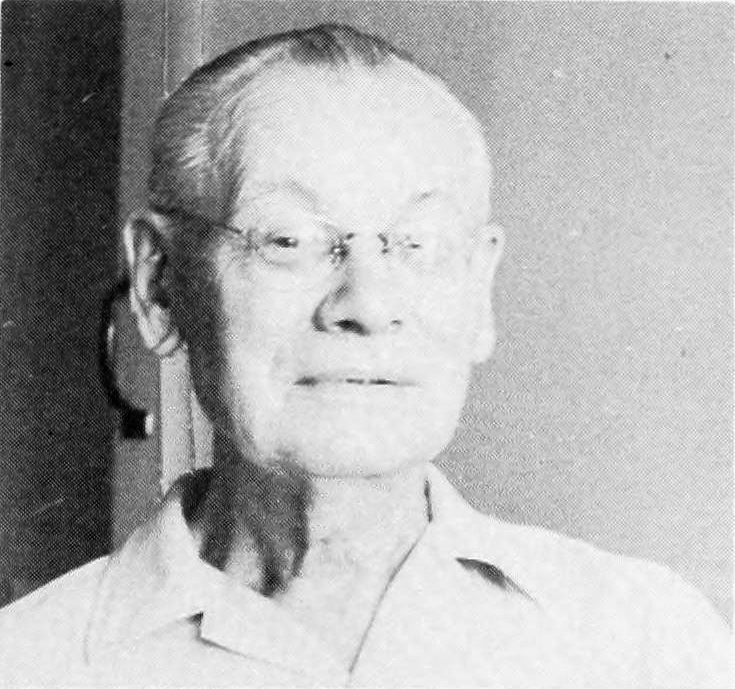
- Joseph Charles Bequaert
- Born: May 24, 1886; Torhout, Belgium
- Died: January 12, 1982 (aged 95); Amherst, Massachusetts
- Education: University of Ghent
- Scientific career
- Fields: malacology, entomology
- Workplaces: American Museum of Natural History and Harvard Medical School

Joseph Charles Bequaert was an American naturalist of Belgian origin, born 24 May 1886 in Torhout (Belgium) and died on 12 January 1982 in Amherst, Massachusetts.

== Career ==
Bequaert obtained a doctorate in botany at the University of Ghent in 1908. He was an entomologist, and from 1910 to 1912 he was part of la commission Belge sur la maladie du sommeil (Belgian Committee on sleeping sickness). From 1913 to 1915 he worked as a botanist in the Belgian Congo and also collected mollusks.

In 1916 he emigrated to the United States and was an associate researcher from 1917 to 1922 at the American Museum of Natural History. He became an American citizen in 1921, and taught entomology at the Harvard Medical School. From 1929 to 1956 he was Curator of Insects at the Museum of Comparative Zoology at Harvard, and was Professor of Zoology from 1951 to 1956 within the same institution.

Bequaert became president of the American Malacological Union in 1954. He left his post at Harvard in 1956. From 1956 to 1960 he lectured in biology at the University of Houston. With Walter Bernard Miller (1918–2000), he published The Mollusks of the Arid Southwest in 1973.

== Memberships ==
He was a member of various learned societies: Zoological Society of France, the Entomological Society of America, the Belgian Royal Society of Entomology, the Belgian Society of Tropical Medicine, the Royal Institute of Colonial Belgium, Koninklijk Natuurwetenschappelijk Genootschap Dodonaea, and the Natural History Society of North Africa.

== References in botany ==
Bequaert was formerly commemorated in the taxon Bequaertiodendron magalismontanum (Sond.) Heine & J.H.Hemsl. now known as Englerophytum magalismontanum (Sond.) T.D.Penn.

He was also honoured in 1993, in the naming of Normandiodendron bequaertii.

== References in entomology ==
Bequaert was formerly commemorated in several names of ants. Note that only valid names are listed (as of July 2016).

Aenictogiton bequaerti Forel, 1913

Anochetus bequaerti Forel, 1913

Azteca bequaerti Wheeler, 1929

Camponotus confluens bequaerti Forel, 1913

Cataulacus bequaerti Forel, 1913

Centromyrmex bequaerti (Forel, 1913)

Strumigenys bequaerti Santschi, 1923

Crematogaster bequaerti Forel, 1913

Dorylus bequaerti Forel, 1913

Monomorium bequaerti Forel, 1913

Pheidole bequaerti Forel, 1913

Phrynoponera bequaerti Wheeler, 1922

Tetramorium bequaerti Forel, 1913

== References in herpetology ==
Bequaert is commemorated in the scientific name of a species of snake and two frogs:

- Philothamnus bequaerti (Schmidt, 1923)
- Phrynobatrachus bequaerti (Barbour and Loveridge, 1929)
- Leptopelis bequaerti Loveridge, 1941

== Bibliography ==
He published over 250 papers; over 50 of them are about molluscs.

(incomplete)

- Pilsbry HA, Bequaert J (1927). "The Aquatic Mollusks of the Belgian Congo. With a geographical and ecological account of Congo malacology". Bulletin of the American Museum of Natural History 53 (2): 69-602. PDF.
- Bequaert J (1936). "A new North American mason-wasp from Virginia, with notes on some allied forms". Proceedings of the United States National Museum 84 (3004): 79–87.
- Bequaert J (1948). Monograph of the Strophocheilidae, neotropical family of terrestrial mollusks. Cambridge, Massachusetts: Museum of Comparative Zoology. 210 pp.
- Bequaert J (1950). Studies in the Achatininae, a group of African land snails. Cambridge, Massachusetts: Museum of Comparative Zoology. 216 pp.
- Bequaert J, Miller WB (1973). The mollusks of the arid Southwest, with an Arizona checklist. Tucson: University of Arizona Press. xvi + 271 p.
