= Paul Gustav Eduard Speiser =

German entomologist (1877–1945)

Paul Gustav Eduard Speiser (1877–1945) was a German entomologist who specialised in Diptera.

Speiser was first a physician, then a Medizinalrat, a medical adviser to a district. He worked on world Diptera, especially Nycteribiidae, and was an eminent medical entomologist.

== Works ==
(Partial list)

- 1900. Venti Specie di Zanzare (Culicidae) Italiane Classate e Descritte e Indicate Secondo la Loro Distribuzione corologica. Centralblatt Bact. Parasit und Infektioskrankheiten 28: 297–402.
- 1901. Ueber die Nycteribiiden, Fledermausparasiten aus der Gruppe der pupiparen Dipteren. Archiv für Naturgeschichte 66: 31–70.
- 1902. Studien Uber Diptera Pupipara. Z. Syst. Hym. Dipt. 2: 145–180.
- 1902. Diptera (Supplement). Diptera Pupipara. Fauna Hawaiiensis 3(2): 86–92.
- 1908. Dipteren aus Deutschlands afrikanischen Kolonien. Berl. Ent. Z. 52: 127–149.
- 1910. Orthorhapha. Orthorhapha Brachycera. Wissenschaftliche Ergebnisse der Schwedischen Zoologischen Expedition nach dem Kilimandjaro, dem Meru und den umbgebenden Massaisteppen Deutsch-Ostafrikas 1905–1906 unter Leitung von Prof. Dr. Yngve Sjöstedt. Diptera. P. Palmquists. 2. 65–112.
- 1923. Aethiopische Dipteren. Weiner Entomologische Zeitung. 40: 81–99.
- 1904. Zur Nomenclatur blutsaugender Dipteren Amerikas. Insektenbörse 21: 148.
- 1907. Check-list of North American Diptera Pupipara. Entomological News 18: 103–105.
- 1908. Die geographische Verbreitung der Diptera pupipara und ihre Phylogenie. Zeitschrift für Wissenschaftliche Insektenbiologie 4: 437–447.
