= List of bugs of Nepal (Scutelleridae) =

The following is a list of bugs of the family Scutelleridae of Nepal. Seventeen different species are listed.

This list is primarily based on V.K. Thapa's 2000 "An Inventory of Nepal's Insects" and Samudra Lal Joshi's 2001 "Reference Insects of Nepal" with some recent additions and a modernized classification.

- Calliphara excellens - excellent jewel bug
- Cantao ocellatus
- Chrysocoris patricius
- Chrysocoris pulchellus
- Chrysocoris stolli
- Eucorysses grandis
- Lamprocoris roylii
- Poecilocoris childreni
- Poecilocoris crowleyi
- Poecilocoris hardwickii
- Poecilocoris druraei syn. Poecilocoris heissi
- Poecilocoris interruptus
- Poecilocoris nepalensis - Nepalese jewel bug
- Poecilocoris orientalis
- Poecilocoris ornatus
- Poecilocoris pseudolatus
- Poecilocoris purpurascens
- Solenostethium rubropunctatum

== See also ==
- List of butterflies of Nepal
- Odonata of Nepal
- Cerambycidae of Nepal
- Wildlife of Nepal
- How to Get Rid of Bed Bugs in Nepal
