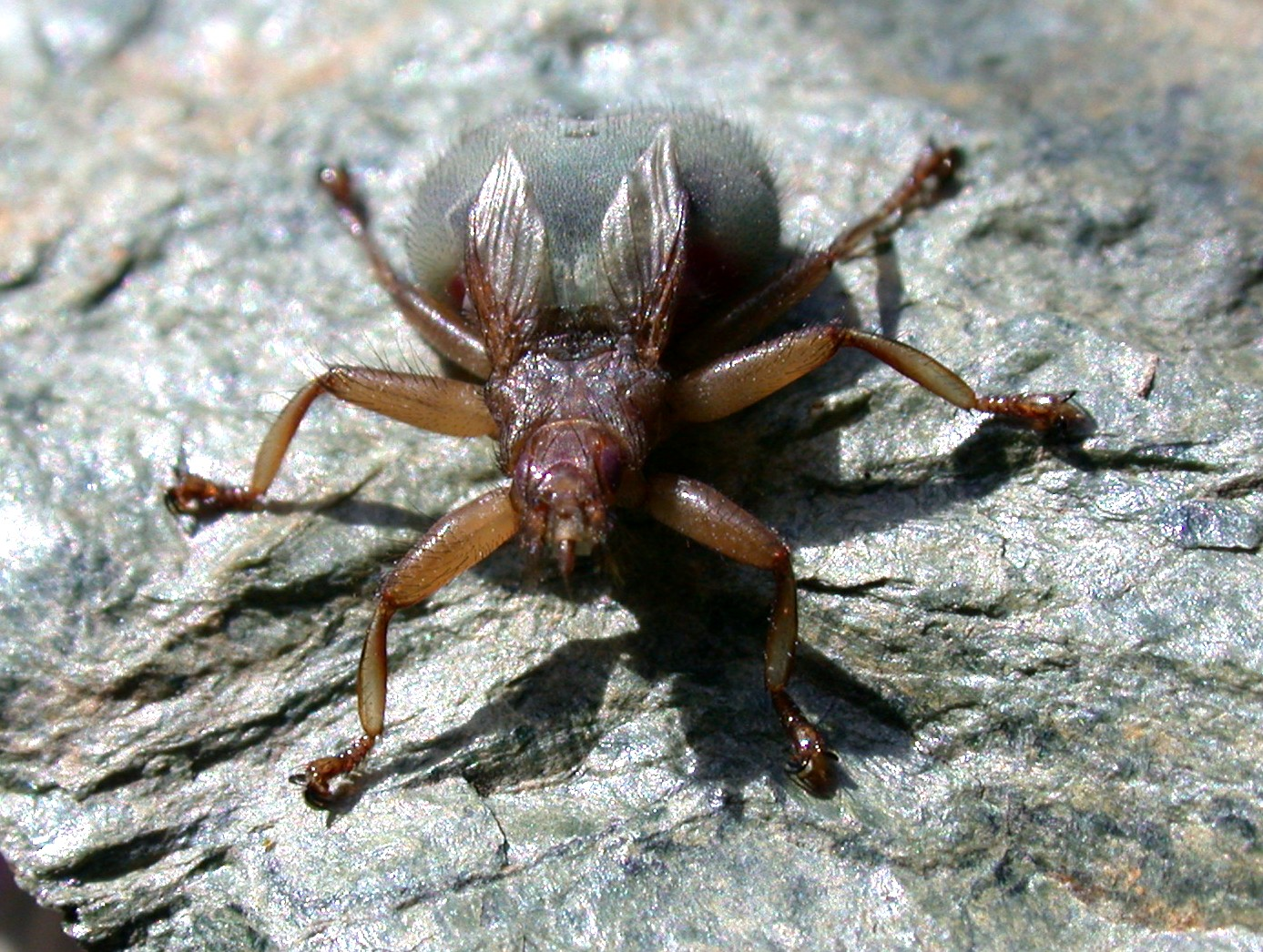
- Crataerina pallida

Scientific classification
- Kingdom: Animalia
- Phylum: Arthropoda
- Clade: Pancrustacea
- Class: Insecta
- Order: Diptera
- Family: Hippoboscidae
- Subfamily: Ornithomyinae
- Genus: Crataerina von Olfers, 1816

Synonyms
- Oxypterum Leach, 1817; Crataerhina Speiser, 1900; Crataerrhina Speiser, 1900

= Crataerina =

Genus of flies

Crataerina is a genus of louse flies in the family Hippoboscidae. All are parasites of birds, feeding on the blood of various species of Apodidae (swifts) and Hirundinidae (swallows and martins). The genus is sometimes spelled Craterina.

== Species ==
- C. acutipennis Austen, 1926 - hosts include Apus affinis, A. caffer, A. horus, A. pallidus, A. unicolor
- C. debilis Maa, 1975
- C. hirundinis (Linnaeus, 1758) - hosts include Delichon urbicum, D. dasypus, Hirundo rustica, Riparia riparia, Ptyonoprogne rupestris
- C. melbae (Rondani, 1879) - hosts include Apus melba, A. pacificus cooki, A. apus, Tachymarptis aequatorialis.
- C. obtusipennis Austen, 1926
- C. pacifica Iwasa, 2001 - hosts include Apus pacificus
- C. pallida (Olivier in Latreille, 1812) - hosts include Apus apus
- C. seguyi Falcoz, 1929 - hosts include Alopochelidon fuscata, Notiochelidon cyanoleuca, N. murina
