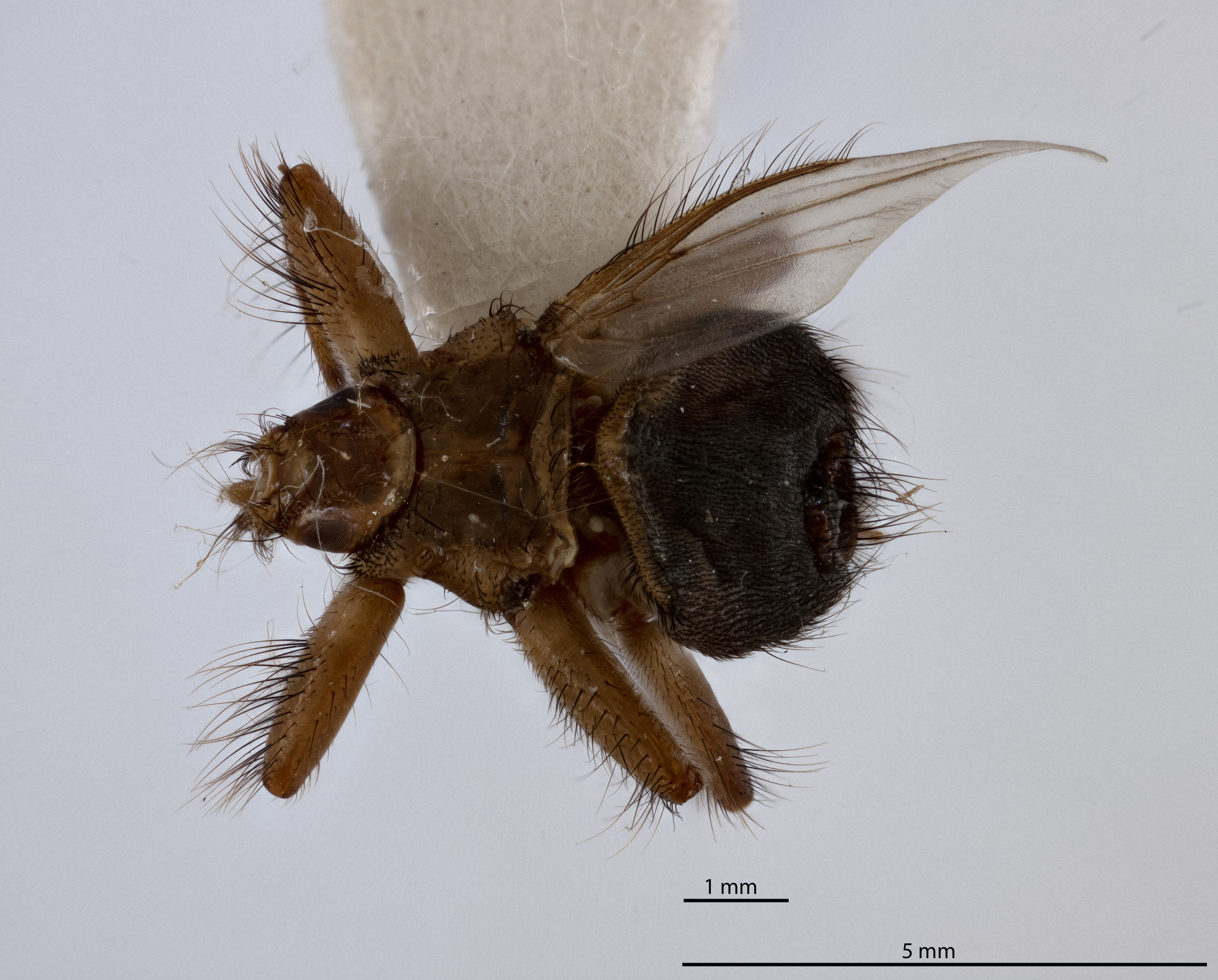
- Adult male

Scientific classification
- Kingdom: Animalia
- Phylum: Arthropoda
- Clade: Pancrustacea
- Class: Insecta
- Order: Diptera
- Family: Hippoboscidae
- Genus: Crataerina
- Species: C. acutipennis

Binomial name
- Crataerina acutipennis Austen, 1926

= Crataerina acutipennis =

Species of fly

Crataerina acutipennis, is a species of biting fly in the family of louse flies Hippoboscidae. Its hosts are swift species including the little, white-rumped, Horus, pallid and plain swifts.
