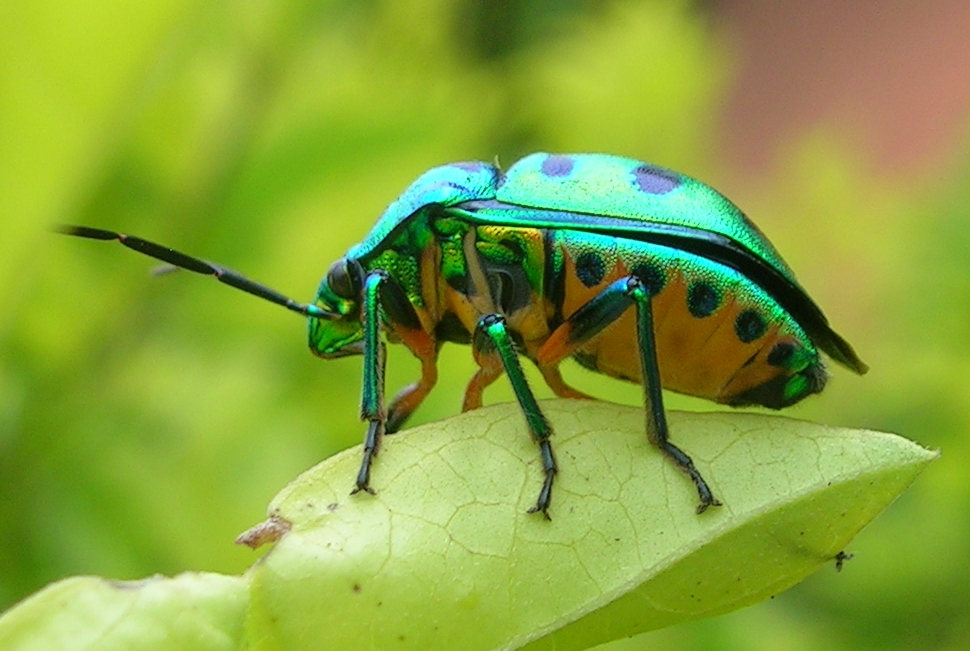
- Chrysocoris stollii

Scientific classification
- Kingdom: Animalia
- Phylum: Arthropoda
- Class: Insecta
- Order: Hemiptera
- Suborder: Heteroptera
- Family: Scutelleridae
- Tribe: Scutellerini
- Genus: Chrysocoris; Hahn, 1834

Synonyms
- Galostha Amyot & Serville, 1843

= Chrysocoris =

Genus of true bugs

Chrysocoris is a genus of brightly colored shield-backed bugs belonging to the family Scutelleridae, erected by Carl Wilhelm Hahn in 1834. Species are recorded from South and South East Asia.

== Selected species ==
The following are included in BioLib.cz:

subgenus Chlorolampra Stål, 1873

1. Chrysocoris germari (Eschscholtz, 1822)

subgenus Chrysocoris Hahn, 1834

1. Chrysocoris abdominalis (Westwood, 1837)
2. Chrysocoris dilaticollis (Guerin, 1830)
3. Chrysocoris eques (Fabricius, 1794)
4. Chrysocoris hypomelaenus (Vollenhoven, 1863)
5. Chrysocoris patricius (Fabricius, 1798)
6. Chrysocoris purpureus (Westwood, 1781)
7. Chrysocoris stockerus (Linnaeus, 1764)
8. Chrysocoris stollii (Wolff, 1801) - type species (as Cimex stollii Wolff)

Unplaced species

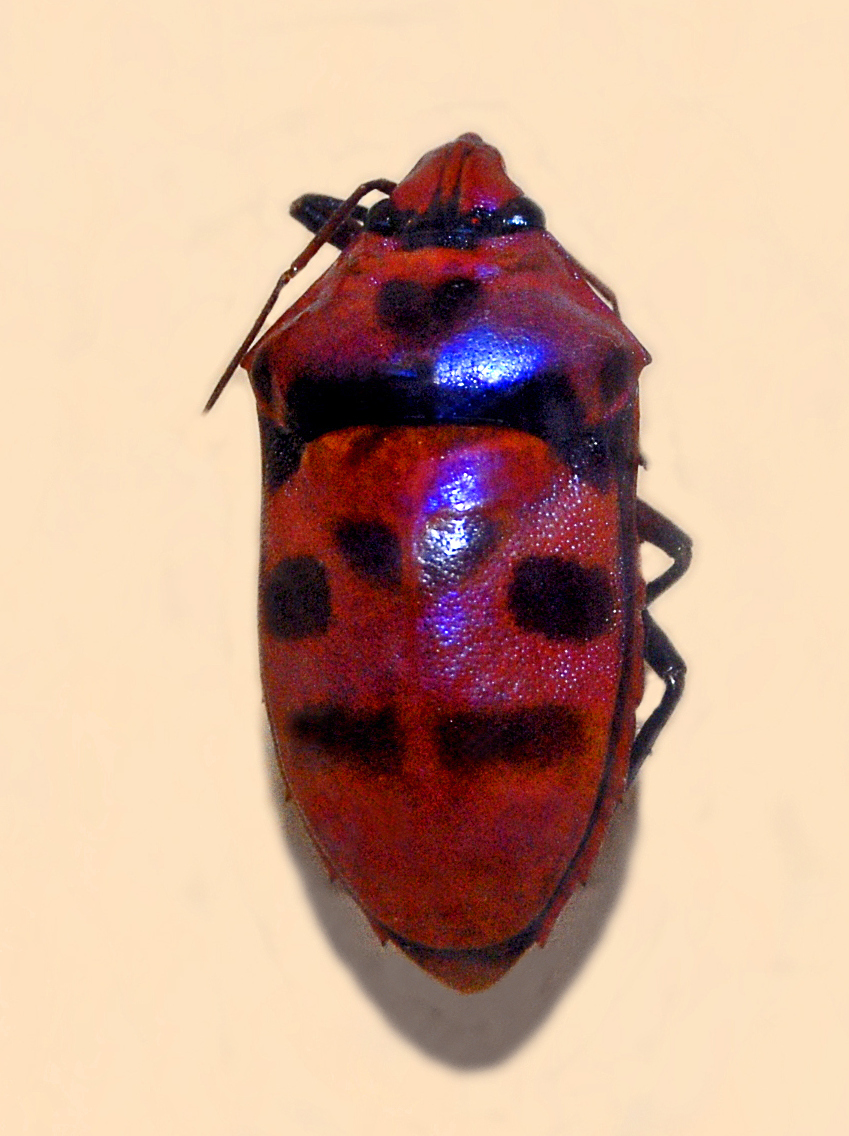
C. iris

1. Chrysocoris andamanensis Atkinson, 1887
2. Chrysocoris atriventris Atkinson, 1887
3. Chrysocoris fascialis White, 1842
4. Chrysocoris indigoferus Distant, 1901
5. Chrysocoris marginellus (Westwood, 1837)
6. Chrysocoris nicobarensis Distant, 1892
7. Chrysocoris ornatus (Dallas, 1851)
8. Chrysocoris pulchellus (Dallas, 1851)
9. Chrysocoris simplex Atidnson, 1889
10. Chrysocoris spilogaster (Walker, 1867)

Note: Chrysocoris grandis (Thunberg, 1783) and Chrysocoris iris (Germar, 1839) are synonyms of Eucorysses grandis (Thunberg, 1783)
