= Sodalis =

Sodalis (Latin for "companion") may refer to:

- Sodalis, a member of a Sodalitas, various Roman religious and secular fraternities and societies
  - Sodalis Augustalis, the college of priests responsible for the cult of the Julian dynasty
- Sodalis, an uncommon cognomen
- Sodalis (bacterium), a genus of bacteria
- Sodalis USA, a personal care company
