= Cantao =

Cantao may refer to:

- Cantão, a Brazilian forest ecosystem
- Cantao, a genus of bugs in the family Scutelleridae
- Cantão State Park, a state park in Tocantins, Brazil
