= Crataerina melbae =

Scientific classification
- Kingdom: Animalia
- Phylum: Arthropoda
- Clade: Pancrustacea
- Class: Insecta
- Order: Diptera
- Family: Hippoboscidae
- Genus: Crataerina
- Species: C. melbae

Binomial name
- Crataerina melbae (Rondani, 1879)

Species of fly

Crataerina melbae is a species of biting fly in the family of louse flies Hippoboscidae. Its hosts are swift species including the Alpine, Pacific, Common and mottled swifts.

Crataerina melbae was shown to contain symbiotic bacterium Sodalis.
