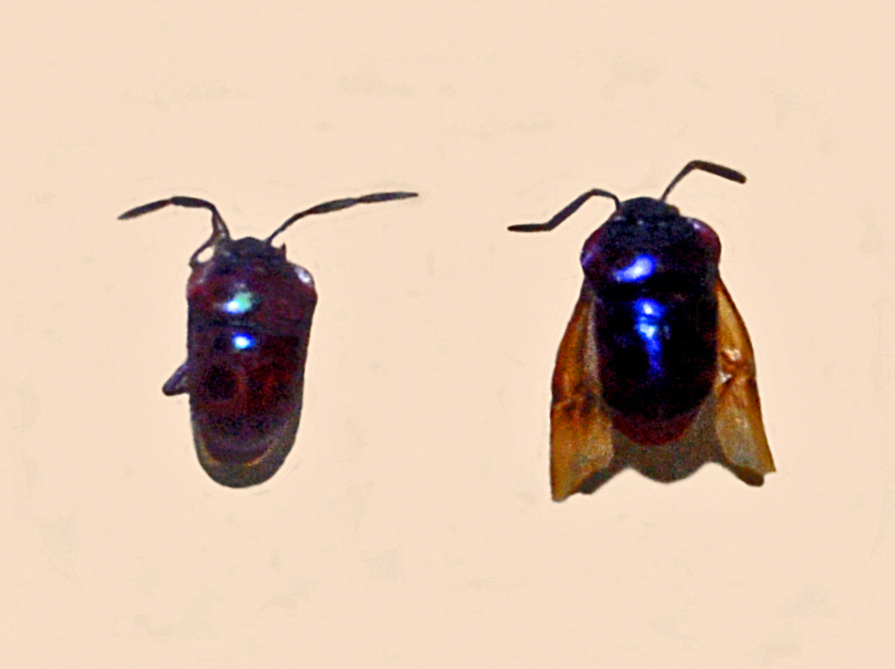
- Chrysocoris eques from Sumatra. Museum specimen

Scientific classification
- Kingdom: Animalia
- Phylum: Arthropoda
- Class: Insecta
- Order: Hemiptera
- Suborder: Heteroptera
- Family: Scutelleridae
- Genus: Chrysocoris
- Species: C. eques

Binomial name
- Chrysocoris eques Fabricius, 1794

Synonyms
- Cimex eques Fabricius, 1794; Tetyra eques Fabricius, 1803; Callidea formosa Westwood, 1837; Callidea dorsalis White, 1842; Galostha eques Amyot and Serville, 1843; Chrysocoris eques Distant, 1902

= Chrysocoris eques =

Species of true bug

Chrysocoris eques is a species of shield-backed bugs belonging to the family Scutelleridae.

== Distribution ==
This species can be found in India, Indonesia, Sumatra, and Myanmar.
