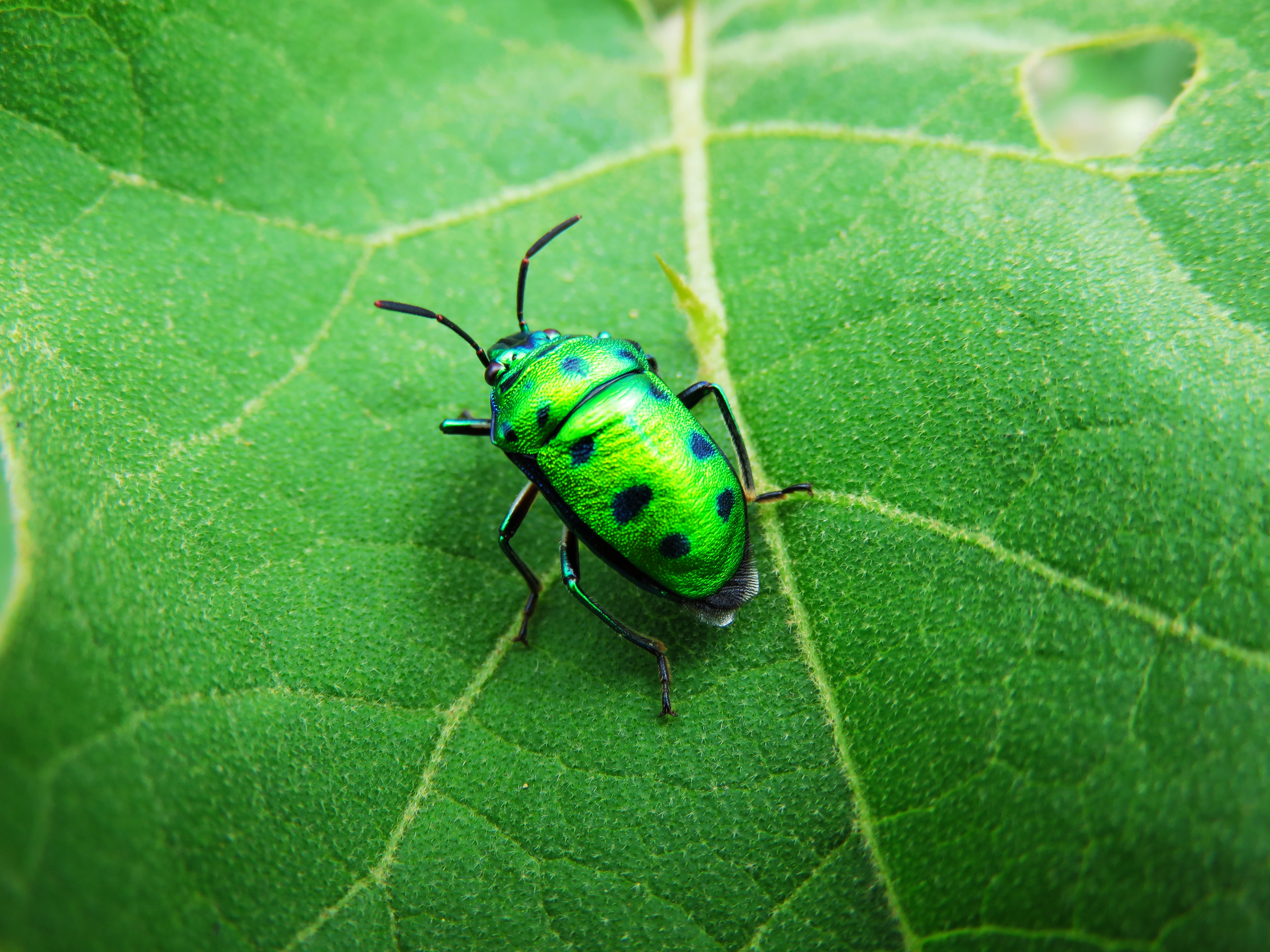
- Chrysocoris stollii captured on a leaf at Nandi Hills, Bangalore, India

Scientific classification
- Kingdom: Animalia
- Phylum: Arthropoda
- Clade: Pancrustacea
- Class: Insecta
- Order: Hemiptera
- Suborder: Heteroptera
- Family: Scutelleridae
- Genus: Chrysocoris
- Species: C. stollii

Binomial name
- Chrysocoris stollii (Wolff, 1801)

= Chrysocoris stollii =

Species of true bug

Chrysocoris stollii is a polyphagous species of jewel bugs (Scutelleridae) common in continental Southeast Asia.

== Description ==
General colour of dorsum metallic blue, green, or purple; abdominal venter yellow, broadly margined with purple laterad to spiracles, spiracles II–VII each surrounded by a rounded black spot; pro-, meso- and metepimeroids together with the supracoxal lobes yellow; coxae and trochanters pale yellow, femora with an apical annulus and longitudinal bands black, tibiae and tarsi black.

== Bionomics ==
These insects feed on plant juices from a variety of different species, including some commercial crops such as Pigeon pea, Pongamia, Arecanut, Jatropha etc.

== Distribution ==
One of the most common and abundant scutellerid in continental Southeast Asia. It is distributed all over Indochina and through the Sub-Himalayan Belt it extends up to Pakistan. Verified records are available from Bangladesh, Cambodia, China, India, Malaysia, Myanmar, Pakistan, Taiwan, Thailand, Vietnam; literature records from Korea, Sri Lanka, the Philippines and Indonesia are erroneous.

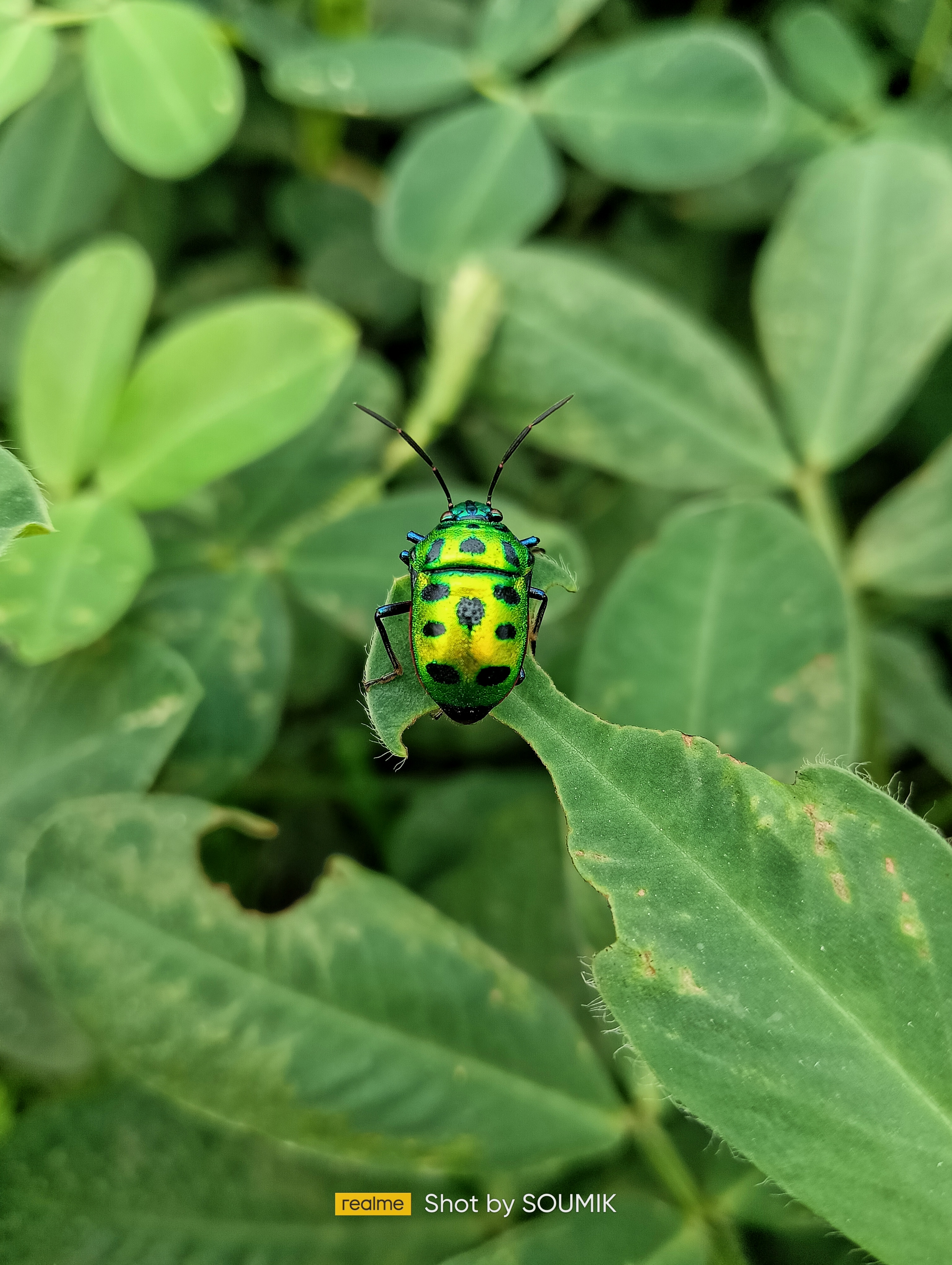
A beautiful looking shiny hemipteran polyphagous pest of Southeast Asia
