= Crataerina pacifica =

Scientific classification
- Kingdom: Animalia
- Phylum: Arthropoda
- Clade: Pancrustacea
- Class: Insecta
- Order: Diptera
- Family: Hippoboscidae
- Genus: Crataerina
- Species: C. pacifica

Binomial name
- Crataerina pacifica Iwasa, 2001

Species of fly

Crataerina pacifica is a species of biting fly in the family of louse flies Hippoboscidae. It has been found in the nest of the Pacific swift (Apus pacificus).
