= Sodalis glossinidius =

Scientific classification
- Domain: Bacteria
- Kingdom: Pseudomonadati
- Phylum: Pseudomonadota
- Class: Gammaproteobacteria
- Order: Enterobacterales
- Family: Pectobacteriaceae
- Genus: Sodalis
- Species: S. glossinidius

Binomial name
- Sodalis glossinidius Dale and Maudlin 1999

Species of bacterium

Sodalis glossinidius is a species of bacteria, the type and only species of its genus. It is a microaerophilic secondary endosymbiont of the tsetse fly. Strain M1T is the type strain. Sodalis glossinidius is the only gammaproteobacterial insect symbiont to be cultured and thus amenable to genetic modification, suggesting that it could be used as part of a control strategy by vectoring antitrypanosome genes. The organism may increase the susceptibility of tsetse flies to trypanosomes.

== Genome ==
The genome of S. glossinidius spans 4.17 MB and encodes 2,431 protein-coding genes plus 1,501 pseudogenes. It is thus almost as large as that of Escherichia coli (~4,100 genes). However, the number of genes encoding metabolic proteins is twice as large in E. coli, indicating that Sodalis has already a much reduced metabolic capacity.

Despite gene erosion and pseudogene multiplication in a genome of Sodalis glossinidius, its pseudogenes remain actively transcribed.

== Parasites ==
Sodalis glossinidius is itself host to a prophage discovered by Clark et al. 2007.
