= Symbiotic bacteria =

Type of bacteria

Symbiotic bacteria are bacteria living in symbiosis with another organism or each other. For example, rhizobia living in root nodules of legumes provide nitrogen fixing activity for these plants.

== Types of symbiosis ==
Types of symbiotic relationships are mutualism, commensalism, parasitism, and amensalism.

=== Endosymbiosis ===
Endosymbionts live inside other organisms whether that be in their bodies or cells. The theory of endosymbiosis, as known as symbiogenesis, provides an explanation for the evolution of eukaryotic organisms. According to the theory of endosymbiosis for the origin of eukaryotic cells, scientists believe that eukaryotes originated from the relationship between two or more prokaryotic cells approximately 2.7 billion years ago. It is suggested that specifically ancestors of mitochondria and chloroplasts entered into an endosymbiotic relationship with another prokaryotic cell, eventually evolving into the eukaryotic cells that people are familiar with today.

=== Ectosymbiosis ===
Ectosymbiosis is defined as a symbiotic relationship in which one organism lives on the outside surface of a different organism. For instance, barnacles on whales is an example of an ectosymbiotic relationship where the whale provides the barnacle with a home, a ride, and access to food. The whale is not harmed, but it also does not receive any benefits so this is also an example of commensalism. An example of ectosymbiotic bacteria is cutibacterium acnes. These bacteria are involved in a symbiotic relationship with humans on whose skin they live. Cutibacterium acnes can cause acne when the skin becomes too oily, but they also reduce the skin's susceptibility to skin diseases caused by oxidative stress.

== Symbiotic relationships ==
Certain plants establish a symbiotic relationship with bacteria, enabling them to produce nodules that facilitate the conversion of atmospheric nitrogen to ammonia. In this connection, cytokinins have been found to play a role in the development of root fixing nodules. It appears that not only must the plant have a need for nitrogen fixing bacteria, but they must also be able to synthesize cytokinins which promote the production of root nodules, required for nitrogen fixation.

Symbiotic bacteria are able to live in or on plant or animal tissue. In digestive systems, symbiotic bacteria help break down foods that contain fiber. They also help produce vitamins. Symbiotic bacteria can live near hydrothermal vents. They usually have a mutual relationship with other bacteria. Some live in tube worms.

== Transmission ==
There are two major modes of transmission for symbiotic bacteria. The first is horizontal transmission in which microbes are acquired from the environment and either the environment or the host population serves as the inoculum for the symbiosis. An example of horizontal transmission is the deep sea tube worm and its symbiont. The second type of transmission is vertical transmission in which the symbiont is passed down from the parent to the offspring and there is no aposymbiotic phase. An example of vertical transmission is seen in Drosophila melanogaster and its Wolbachia spp. symbionts.

== Examples of Symbiotic Relationships ==
=== Corals ===
Corals have been found to form characteristic associations with symbiotic nitrogen-fixing bacteria. Corals have evolved in oligotrophic waters which are typically poor in nitrogen. Corals must therefore form a mutualistic relationship with nitrogen fixing organism, in this case the subject of this study, namely Symbiodinium. In addition to this dinoflagellate, coral also form relationships with bacteria, archae and fungi. The problem is that these dinoflagellates are also nitrogen limited and must form a symbiotic relationship with another organism; here it is suggested to be diazotrophs. In addition, cyanobacteria have been found to possess genes that enable them to undergo nitrogen fixation. This particular study goes further to investigate the possibility that in addition to the named dinoflagellate and certain cyanobacteria, endosymbiotic algae and the coral contain enzymes enabling them to both undergo ammonium assimilation.

Due to the small size of the genome of most endosymbionts, they are unable to exist for any length of time outside of the host cell, thereby preventing a long-term symbiotic relationship. However, in the case of the endonuclear symbiotic bacterium Holospora, it has been discovered that Holospora species can maintain their infectivity for a limited time and form a symbiotic relationship with Paramecium species.

=== Plants and rhizobial bacteria ===
There is a mutualistic relationship between legumes and rhizobial bacteria enabling the plants to survive in an otherwise nitrogen-poor soil environment. Co-evolution is described as a situation where two organisms evolve in response to one another. In a study reported in Functional Ecology, these scientists investigated whether such a mutualistic relationship conferred an evolutionary advantage to either plant or symbiont. They did not find that the rhizobial bacteria studied had any evolutionary advantage with their host but did find great genetic variation among the populations of rhizobial bacteria studied.

=== Chemosynthetic Bacteria and Mussels ===
Symbiotic, chemosynthetic bacteria that have been discovered associated with mussels (Bathymodiolus) located near hydrothermal vents have a gene that enables them to utilize hydrogen as a source of energy, in preference to sulphur or methane as their energy source for production of energy.

=== Termites and Cellulase-Producing Bacteria ===
Termites are known by many as pests that feed on wood. However, termites cannot digest the wood alone. Instead, they rely on a non-bacterial protozoan called Trichonympha to help in the digestion process. Trichonympha is an endosymbiont that lives inside termites and also acts as a host to bacterial symbionts. The bacteria inside Trichonympha in termites produces cellulase. Cellulase enzymes are used to break down cellulose which is found in plants' cell walls. The termites, the gut protist Trichonympha, and the cellulase-producing bacteria are all involved in a 3-way obligate symbiotic mutualism. The termites benefit from the other two species because they transform the wood into nutrients that the termites can digest. Additionally, the Trichonympha benefit from the termites because the termites provide a place to live and access to food. The Trichonympha also benefit from the bacteria because they help break down the cellulose in wood that the protist consumes. Finally, the bacteria benefits because it gains a place to live and the nutrients it needs to survive.

=== Symbiotic Bacteria in Humans ===
==== Gut Bacteria ====
The human gut contains approximately thirty-eight trillion microbes. The gut is a dynamic ecosystem as it is composed of both constant and transient components, meaning some bacteria establish themselves and remain throughout the human's lifetime and other bacteria are ingested and later leave in feces. When babies are born, they are born without any bacteria in their intestines. However, as soon as they enter the world, they begin accumulating gut bacteria through food and other means. Most bacteria in the human body are actually beneficial and help with carrying out necessary life processes. Gut bacteria in humans often aid in the breakdown of foods and synthesize important vitamins that could not be processed by the human body alone. Therefore, humans must be careful when taking antibiotics when they are sick. Antibiotics do not differentiate between the helpful and dangerous bacteria in our bodies and therefore, kill both. If not treated carefully, this can lead to issues with the gastrointestinal tract because of an imbalance of bacteria in this microbiome. Therefore, some doctors recommend taking a probiotic when taking antibiotics to restore the helpful bacteria.

== Benefits of Bacterial Symbiosis ==
Organisms typically establish a symbiotic relationship due to their limited availability of resources in their habitat or due to a limitation of their food source. Triatomine vectors have only one host and therefore must establish a relationship with bacteria to enable them to obtain the nutrients required to maintain themselves.

A use for symbiotic bacteria is in paratransgenesis for controlling important vectors for disease, such as the transmission of Chagas disease by Triatome kissing bugs. Symbiotic bacteria in legume roots provide the plants with ammonia in exchange for the plants' carbon and a protected home.
