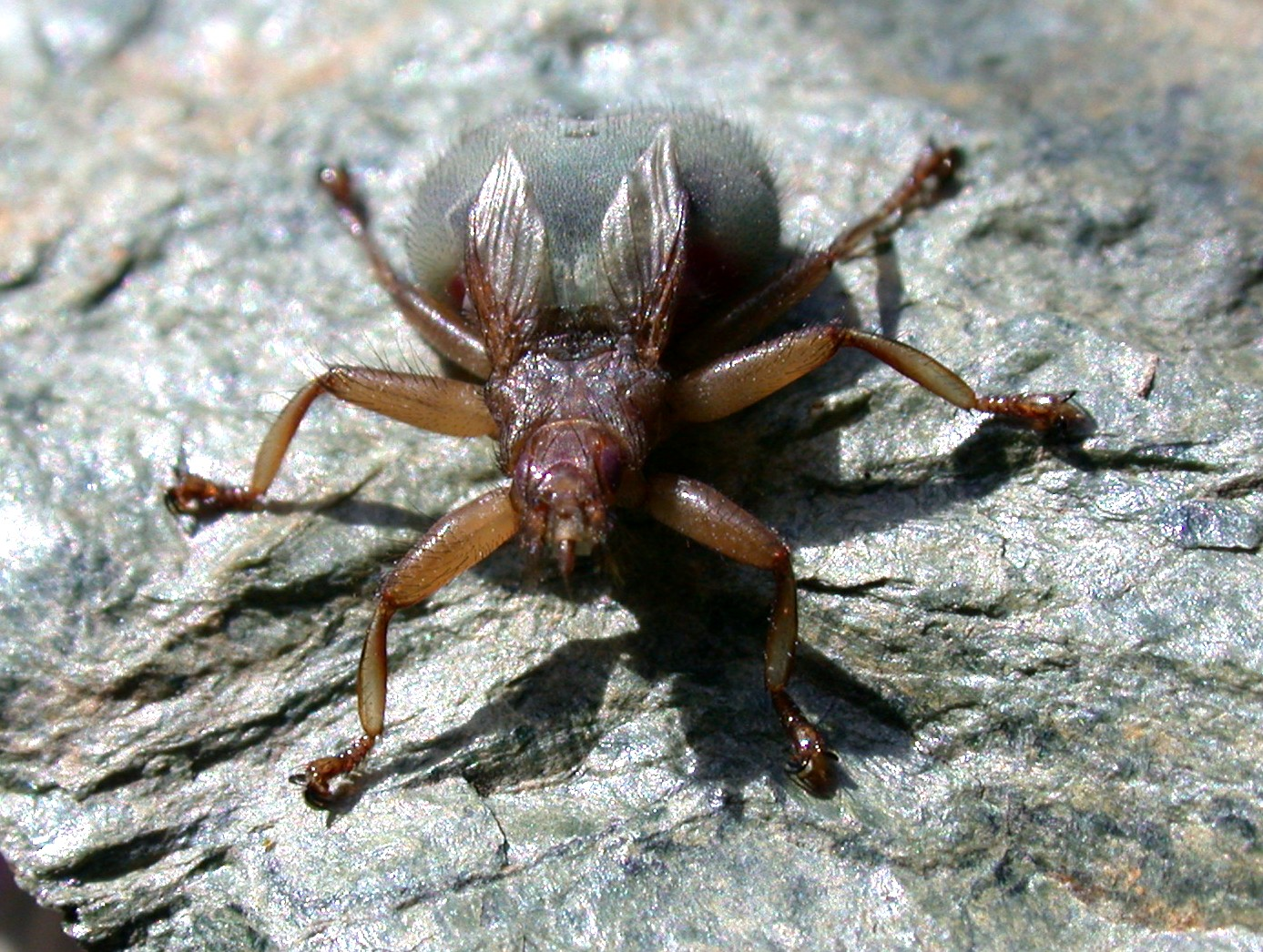

Scientific classification
- Kingdom: Animalia
- Phylum: Arthropoda
- Clade: Pancrustacea
- Class: Insecta
- Order: Diptera
- Family: Hippoboscidae
- Genus: Crataerina
- Species: C. pallida

Binomial name
- Crataerina pallida (Latreille, 1812)

Synonyms
- C. kirbyanum (Leach, 1817); Ornithomyia pallida Latreille, 1812; Oxypterum kirbyanum Leach, 1817

= Crataerina pallida =

Species of fly

Crataerina pallida, the swift lousefly, is a species of biting fly in the family of louse flies Hippoboscidae. These flies are commonly encountered in the nests of the common swift (Apus apus) in Europe and Asia.

The lousefly spends its entire life cycle associated with swifts. The adult lousefly produce larvae in the late summer months which then pupate and lie dormant during the winter months inside the vacated swift nest. These parasites have highly aggregated population distribution and high levels of host prevalence. The adult fly then hatch out in spring when the first swift eggs are laid, by the returning adults, and feed on the blood of the nestlings and the adults, sucking about 25 mg of blood every 5 days. They can be a serious pest of adult and nestling swifts.

Crataerina pallida is a vertically transmitted ectoparasite, in that it is passed from parent host to offspring. C. pallida are relatively benign, because their own species' fitness will depend on successful reproduction of swifts. Evidence suggests that C. pallida had little if any effect on nestling growth or fledging success rate.

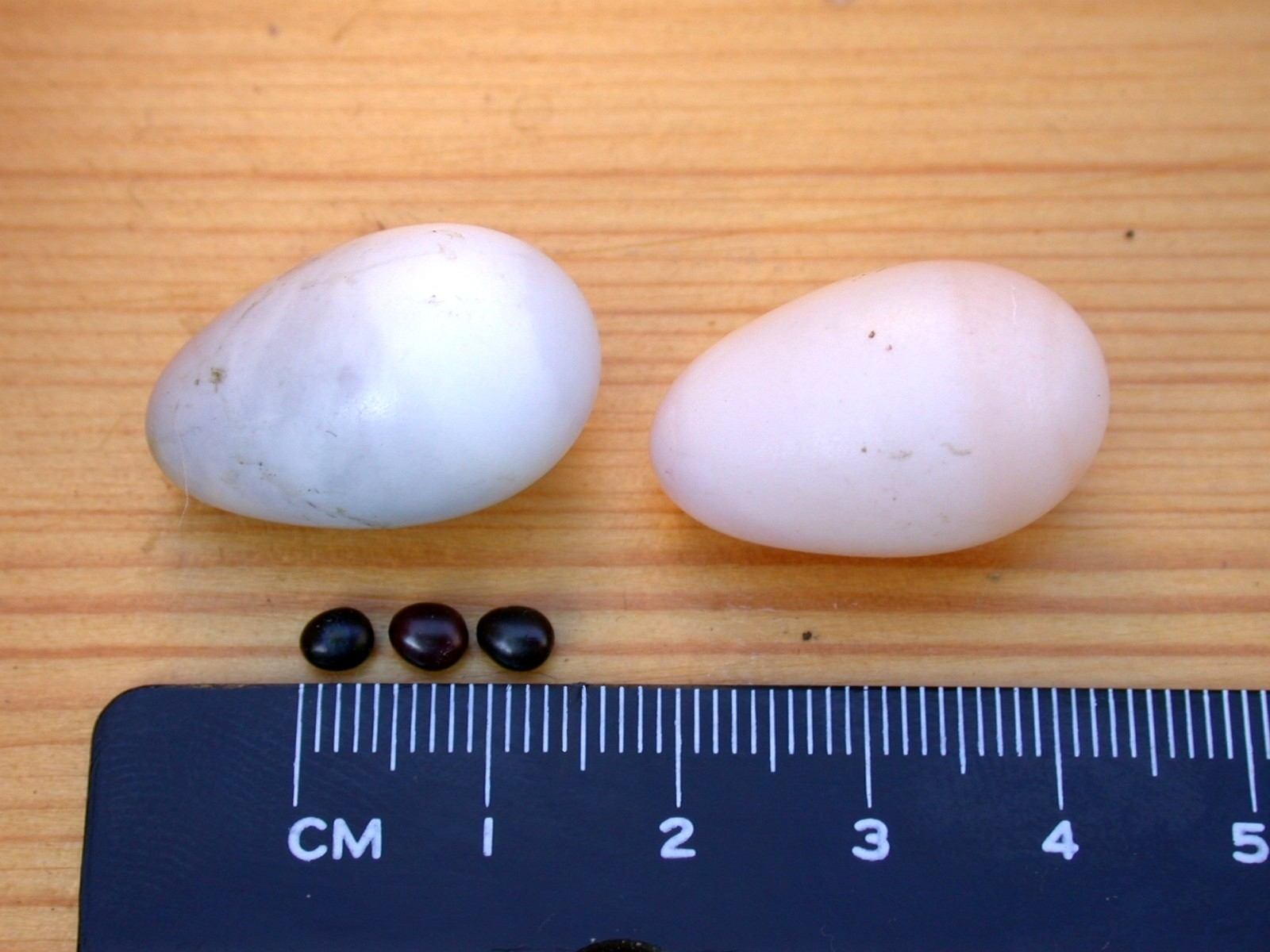
Eggs of the common swift (Apus apus) and (below) pupae of Crataerina pallida
