= Paratransgenesis =

Paratransgenesis is a technique that attempts to eliminate a pathogen from vector populations through transgenesis of a symbiont of the vector. The goal of this technique is to control vector-borne diseases. The first step is to identify proteins that prevent the vector species from transmitting the pathogen. The genes coding for these proteins are then introduced into the symbiont, so that they can be expressed in the vector. The final step in the strategy is to introduce these transgenic symbionts into vector populations in the wild. One use of this technique is to prevent mortality for humans from insect-borne diseases. Preventive methods and current controls against vector-borne diseases depend on insecticides, even though some mosquito breeds may be resistant to them. There are other ways to fully eliminate them. "Paratransgenesis focuses on utilizing genetically modified insect symbionts to express molecules within the vector that are deleterious to pathogens they transmit." The acidic bacteria Asaia symbionts are beneficial in the normal development of mosquito larvae; however, it is unknown what Asais symbionts do to adult mosquitoes.

The first example of this technique used Rhodnius prolixus which is associated with the symbiont Rhodococcus rhodnii. R. prolixus is an important insect vector of Chagas disease that is caused by Trypanosoma cruzi. The strategy was to engineer R. rhodnii to express proteins such as Cecropin A that are toxic to T. cruzi or that block the transmission of T. cruzi.

Attempts are also made in Tse-tse flies using bacteria and in malaria mosquitoes using fungi, viruses, or bacteria.

== Uses ==
Although the use of paratransgenesis can serve many different purposes, one of the main purposes is "breaking the disease cycle". This study focuses on the experiments with tsetse flies and trypanosomes, which cause sleeping sickness in Subsaharan Africa. The tsetse fly's transmission biology was studied to learn how it transmits the disease. This was done inn order to find the best way to use paratransgenesis, which could help solve transmission. In this case, paratransgenesis was used to create trypanocides which stop the transmission of trypanosomes in the tsetse fly vector.

Another disease caused by the transmission of mosquitoes to humans is malaria. This has been an ongoing health issue as there is not an effective vaccine and malaria is deadly. "The development of innovative control measures is an imperative to reduce malaria transmission." In this study, it was found that when using paratransgenesis of Asaia (gfp) in these mosquitoes, there was a lower chance of the disease. They are using anti-pathogen effector molecules.

Another example is in honey bees. A study done in 2012 found that using lactic acid bacteria could improve or help with honey bee's health and digestion. This is a different use of paratransgenesis and was suggested as the Lactobacillus was an easy target for paratransgenesis. The scientists wanted to see if maintaining the microbiome in the insect model's guts would work to keep the bees and the entire colony healthy. There has been a major decrease in honey bee populations and colonies in recent years. By using paratransgenesis, scientists and beekeepers hope to increase the population of honey bees.

== Effects ==
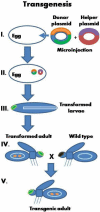
The procedure to generate transgenic insects by germ-line transformation.

Experiments have shown that the spread through mosquito populations is resistant to parasites engineered through symbiotic bacterium Serratia AS1. Major concerns of regulators for the release of such engineered bacteria into the field shows there were zero options for "recall". "Serratia AS1 loses plasmids as it replicates in mosquitoes and in culture, reverting to wild type and that horizontal transfer of the plasmid from Serratia AS1 to other bacteria is difficult to detect." This means the initial field trials can be used in the reversible system besides the released recombinant bacteria expressing antiplasmodial compounds from a plasmid revert to wild type at a certain rate.

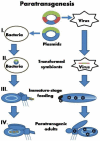
The procedure of insect transformation via transgenic symbionts.

"Paratransgenesis is the genetically modified symbiotic organisms that block pathogen development or transmission by vectors using expressing molecules". Figure 2 shows An. gambiae and Ae. aegypti symbiotic viruses using bacteria symbionts blood-sucking, tsetse flies and mosquitoes. Symbionts expressing molecules targeting pathogen development can have transmission in endemic regions. As with transgenesis, The spread of transformed symbionts benefits from the availability of a gene drive system to replace non-transformed symbionts present in natural vector populations is also seen in transgenesis. Paratransgenesis reduces African trypanosomes transmission by tsetse flies. It has transformed Sodalis, a symbiont of tsetse flies found in the midgut and hemolymph of Glossina m. morsitans, Glossina p. palpalis, Glossina austeni, and Glossina brevipalpis, and the salivary glands of Gl. p. palpalis, which all have transmitted vertically via the female milk glands. Vertical transmission has GFP-transformed (recSodalis) that was detected in 9 out of 12 F1 offspring and eight out of 12 F2 descendents, which has transformed symbiont to be spread across tsetse populations. This resulted in Sodalis being isolated from Gl. m. morsitans and Gl. fuscipes transforming with GFP, the recSodalis obtained colonized septic non-native tsetse host species at a density similar to native colonization.

A future direction on vector paratransgenesis is within the natural insect populations and it has not been determined if transformed symbionts can replace non-transformed symbionts. There are no effects on insect hosts and are capable of being transmitted vertically (via trans-ovarian transmission) or laterally (due to feeding habits) when it comes to symbionts. Wolbachia endosymbionts is a gene driven system and can also affect paratransgenesis.

Wolbachia are intracellular transitional bacteria that control the reproduction of insects via cytoplasmic incompatibility (CI). "Wolbachia-uninfected females will not breed with infected males, which reduces the frequency of uninfected individuals and increases the frequency of Wolbachia-infected insects in a population." This effect will cause other transitional controlled transformed symbionts to spread within an insect population which expands the frequency. These insects include: Ae. aegypti, Aedes albopictus, and Culex quinquefasciatus. Densovirus is an example of how the spread is transformed through symbionts, occurring in the natural populations of mosquitoes.

During the process of conducting as a gene driven mechanism, the Wolbachia strain reduces the mosquito lifespan for pathogen development inside the mosquito (known as the extrinsic incubation period or EIP). Elimination of the disease vectors is hard to treat due to reduced vector lifespan for its own growth from a shorter growth time. This means it targets older mosquitoes over younger ones and this also implies evolution-proof of mosquitocidal biocontrols agents. Time already exists for a selective pressure on pathogen development in Plasmodium-infected mosquitoes for Anopheles (marsh mosquitos) from 20% to 40% per gonotrophic cycle resulting in a shortening of the parasite life cycle within the vector.

"One approach is to reduce vector competence (linear parameter), and vector survivorship (exponential parameter). Both effects together should reduce vectorial capacity and disease burden in endemic areas and prevent transmission."

== Illnesses ==
Vector-borne diseases are common; therefore working to understand how these diseases are transmitted can lead to better prevention of or treatment for these illnesses. Vector borne diseases such as malaria are passed from mosquitoes to humans. Trypanosoma Cruz causes Chagas disease, and there are efforts to use paratransgenesis to prevent the spread of this disease. The strategy is to alter the microbe then reinsert it into the insect that has been genetically modified to alter pathogens. The article "Paratransgenic Control of Vector Borne Diseases'' discusses the approach to understanding these diseases. Human African Trypanosomiasis (sleeping sickness) is an illness that affects many individuals in sub-Saharan Africa. In the last decade the numbers have come close to an elimination. This illness is passed by flies and the past few efforts on controlling this disease is less than 10,000 cases per year.

== Treatment ==
There are many diseases in which paratransgenesis can occur, with the most common being malaria. The paper "Evaluating the usefulness of paratransgenesis for malaria control," describes the global problem of malaria, a cause of significant health issues. It is carried by mosquitoes and although the most useful way to eliminate them is to use insecticides, some mosquito species are resistant to insecticide. In order to combat insecticide-resistant mosquitos, there are genetically engineered plasmodium that has been created to help destroy the mosquito gut. Another study "Using infection to fight infection: paratransgenesis fungi can block malaria transmission in mosquitoes" demonstrates anti-malaria effector genes that were injected into entomopathogenic fungus, Metarhizium anisopliae. Next, the fungus was injected into non-infected mosquitoes and expressed in the hemolymph. The interesting thing about this is when other molecules were coexpressed, the salivary glands expressed Malaria levels up to 98%.

In order to perform paratransgenesis, there are several requirements:

- The symbiotic bacteria can be grown in vitro easily.
- It can be genetically modified, such as through transformation with a plasmid containing the desired gene.
- The engineered symbiont is stable and safe.
- The association between vector and symbiont cannot be attenuated.
- Field delivery is easily handled.
