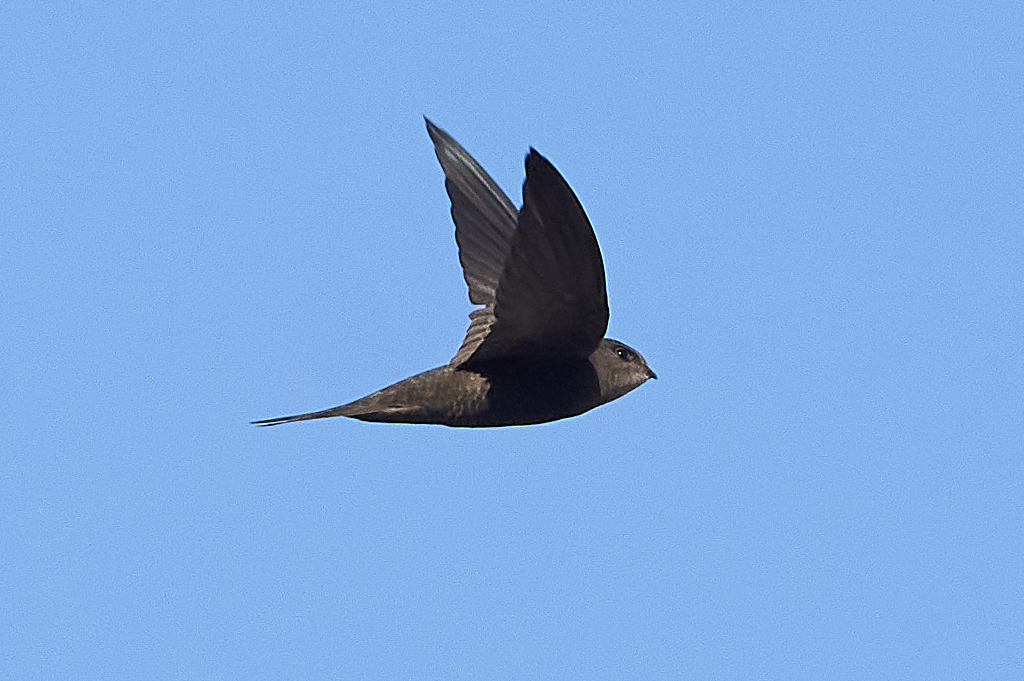

Conservation status
- Least Concern (IUCN 3.1)

Scientific classification
- Kingdom: Animalia
- Phylum: Chordata
- Class: Aves
- Clade: Strisores
- Order: Apodiformes
- Family: Apodidae
- Genus: Apus
- Species: A. unicolor

Binomial name
- Apus unicolor (Jardine, 1830)

= Plain swift =

Species of bird

The plain swift (Apus unicolor) is a medium-sized swift. Although this bird is superficially similar to a barn swallow or house martin, it is not related to those passerine species. The resemblances between the groups are due to convergent evolution reflecting similar life styles.

Swifts have very short legs that they use only for clinging to vertical surfaces. They never settle voluntarily on the ground, and spend most of their lives in the air, feeding on insects that they catch in their beaks. They drink on the wing.

Plain swifts breed in colonies on cliffs, bridges and buildings on the Canary Islands and Madeira, laying two eggs in a saucer-shaped nest made of flowerheads glued with saliva. They are partially migratory, with many birds leaving to winter in mainland Africa. Until recently it was thought that the birds wintered on the African coast but recent studies suggest they travel much further to the equatorial forests of Liberia and Guinea, a distance of 2,600 kilometres. Small numbers are also believed to breed in Morocco between Agadir and Essaouira, where a colony was found on coastal cliffs and possibly also in Mauritania where there are frequent sightings. Small breeding colonies have recently been discovered in mainland Portugal, in Lisbon and Porto.

This 14–15 cm long species is very similar to the closely related common and pallid swifts, which also occur in the archipelagos, and separation is only possible with good views. Like its relatives, it has a short forked tail and very long swept-back wings that resemble a crescent or a boomerang.

It is entirely dark except for an indistinct pale throat patch. It is slimmer and more rakish than the pallid swift, and is darker than that species and lacks the obvious white throat.

Distinguishing the plain swift from the similarly plumaged common swift is much more difficult, although juvenile common can be easily eliminated due to its white throat. The plain is slimmer and appears longer winged than the common, and has scaly underparts, difficult to see except with excellent views. The call is a loud dry scream similar to that of the common swift, though possibly higher pitched.
