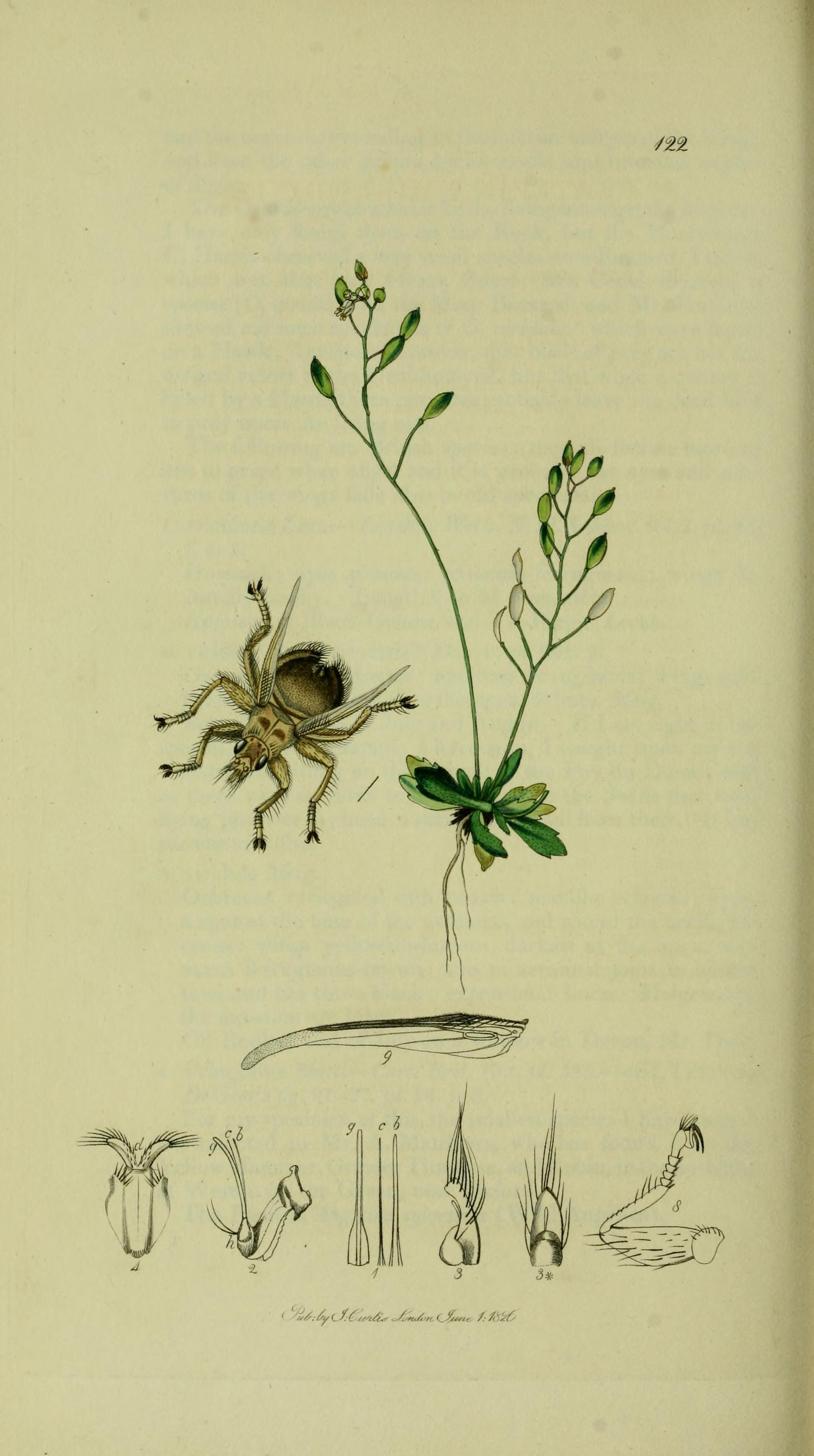
- Stenepteryx hirundinis in British Entomology

Scientific classification
- Kingdom: Animalia
- Phylum: Arthropoda
- Class: Insecta
- Order: Diptera
- Family: Hippoboscidae
- Genus: Crataerina
- Species: C. hirundinis

Binomial name
- Crataerina hirundinis (Linnaeus, 1758)

Synonyms
- Stenepteryx hirundinis (Linnaeus, 1758)

= Crataerina hirundinis =

Species of fly

Crataerina hirundinis is a species of flies belonging to the family Hippoboscidae. It was formerly placed in its own genus, Stenepteryx.

It is found in the Palearctic.

This louse fly is known to be an ectoparasite on the house martin.
