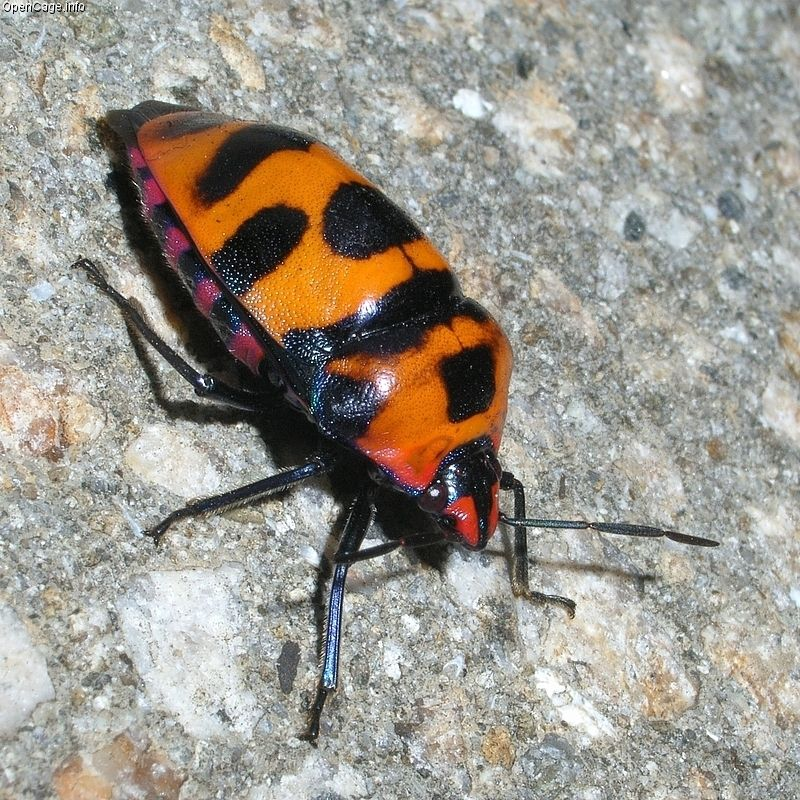
- Eucorysses grandis

Scientific classification
- Domain: Eukaryota
- Kingdom: Animalia
- Phylum: Arthropoda
- Class: Insecta
- Order: Hemiptera
- Suborder: Heteroptera
- Family: Scutelleridae
- Subfamily: Scutellerinae
- Tribe: Scutellerini
- Genus: Eucorysses; Amyot & Audinet-Serville, 1843

= Eucorysses =

Genus of true bugs

External image
- Images at iNaturalist

Eucorysses is a genus of Asian jewel or shield-backed bugs in the tribe Scutellerini, erected by Amyot & Audinet-Serville in 1843. Records of occurrence are from India through southern China to Japan, Indochina and western Malesia.

== Species ==
The following are included in BioLib.cz:

1. Eucorysses grandis (Thunberg, 1783)
2. Eucorysses javanus (Westwood, 1837)
