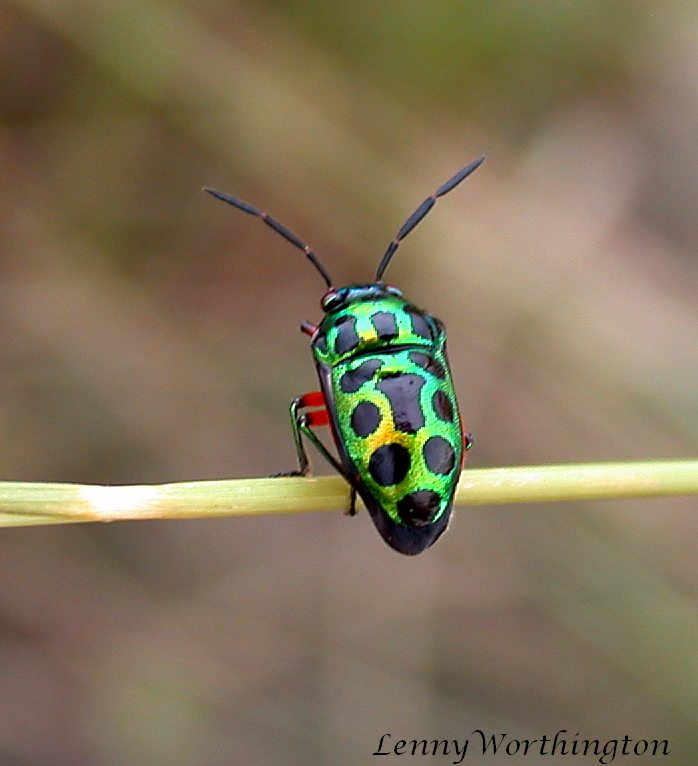

Scientific classification
- Domain: Eukaryota
- Kingdom: Animalia
- Phylum: Arthropoda
- Class: Insecta
- Order: Hemiptera
- Suborder: Heteroptera
- Family: Scutelleridae
- Genus: Chrysocoris
- Species: C. pulchellus

Binomial name
- Chrysocoris pulchellus (Dallas, 1851)

Synonyms
- Callidea pulchella Dallas, 1851; Callidea rama Kirbyi, 1891

= Chrysocoris pulchellus =

Species of true bug

Chrysocoris pulchellus is a jewel bug in the family Scutelleridae.

== Description ==
Adult is 13mm-15.06mm long. Body is metallic green or blue in color. Antennae, rostrum and sternum are black. Sternum margins are brassy green while base of head beneath and abdomen are ochraceous. Femora are reddish ochraceous except for their apices which are black including the tibiae and all tarsal segments. Pronotum has 11 bluish black spots of which 3 transverse spots are in the anterior margin has and 8 are in the posterior pronotum arranged in 1+2+1+1+2+1 fashion. Scutellum carries 8 such spots. One longitudinal in the center surrounded by 2 transverse in anterior portion, 2 from the sides and 2 from the posterior side. One remaining sinuate transverse patch lies in the posteriormost part.

It might look similar to Chrysocoris marginellus but differs in having smaller size and much broader and thicker antennae.

== Distribution ==
It is found in Nepal, India and Sri Lanka.

== Host plants ==
Jatropha curcas, Sandalwood, Lantana
