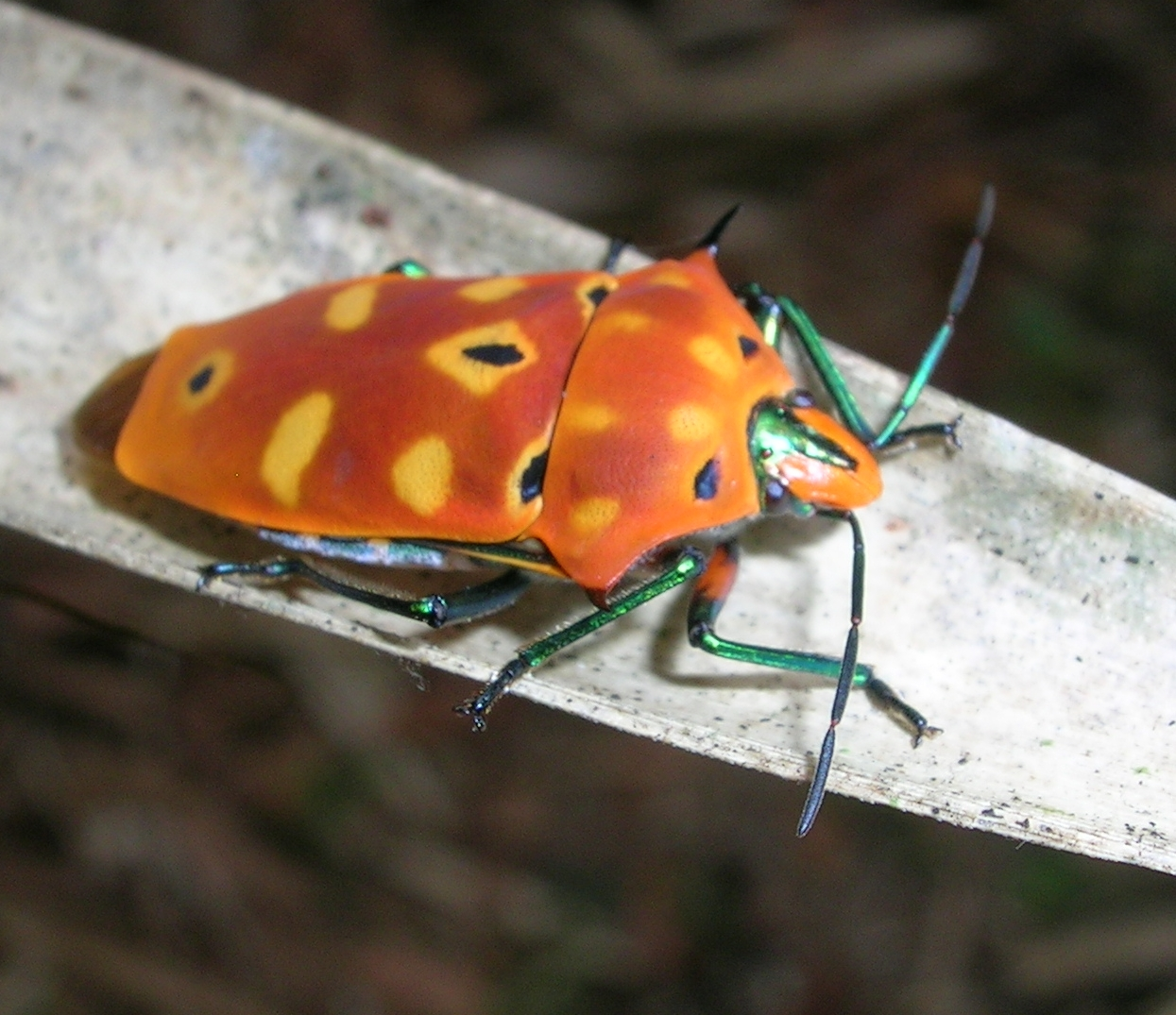

Scientific classification
- Kingdom: Animalia
- Phylum: Arthropoda
- Class: Insecta
- Order: Hemiptera
- Suborder: Heteroptera
- Family: Scutelleridae
- Genus: Cantao
- Species: C. ocellatus

Binomial name
- Cantao ocellatus (Thunberg, 1784)

Synonyms
- Cimex ocellatus Thunberg, 1784; Tetyra dispar Fabricius, 1803

= Cantao ocellatus =

Species of true bug

Cantao ocellatus is a species of shield bug in the family Scutelleridae found across Asia.

== Description ==
Cantao ocellatus is reddish or ochre in overall colour it has dark legs and bluish black antennae. A dark bluish black stripe is present along the central line of the head. The pronotum sometimes has two black spots on the front margin and sometimes has eight spots. The scutellum has eight or six black spots of variable size but with yellowish borders. The lateral angle of the pronotum is elongated into a curved spine but this can be much reduced. A distinctive symbiotic bacterial genus Sodalis from phylum Gammaproteobacteria is found in its midgut. Maternal care of eggs and nymphs has been noted in this species. The female stands over and covers the eggs after they are laid but eggs on the edge that she cannot cover are often parasitized by wasps.

== Distribution ==
Cantao ocellatus has been reported from the Indian Subcontinent into Southeast Asia and Papua New Guinea. It has also been reported from Japan and Zaire.

== Behaviour and ecology ==
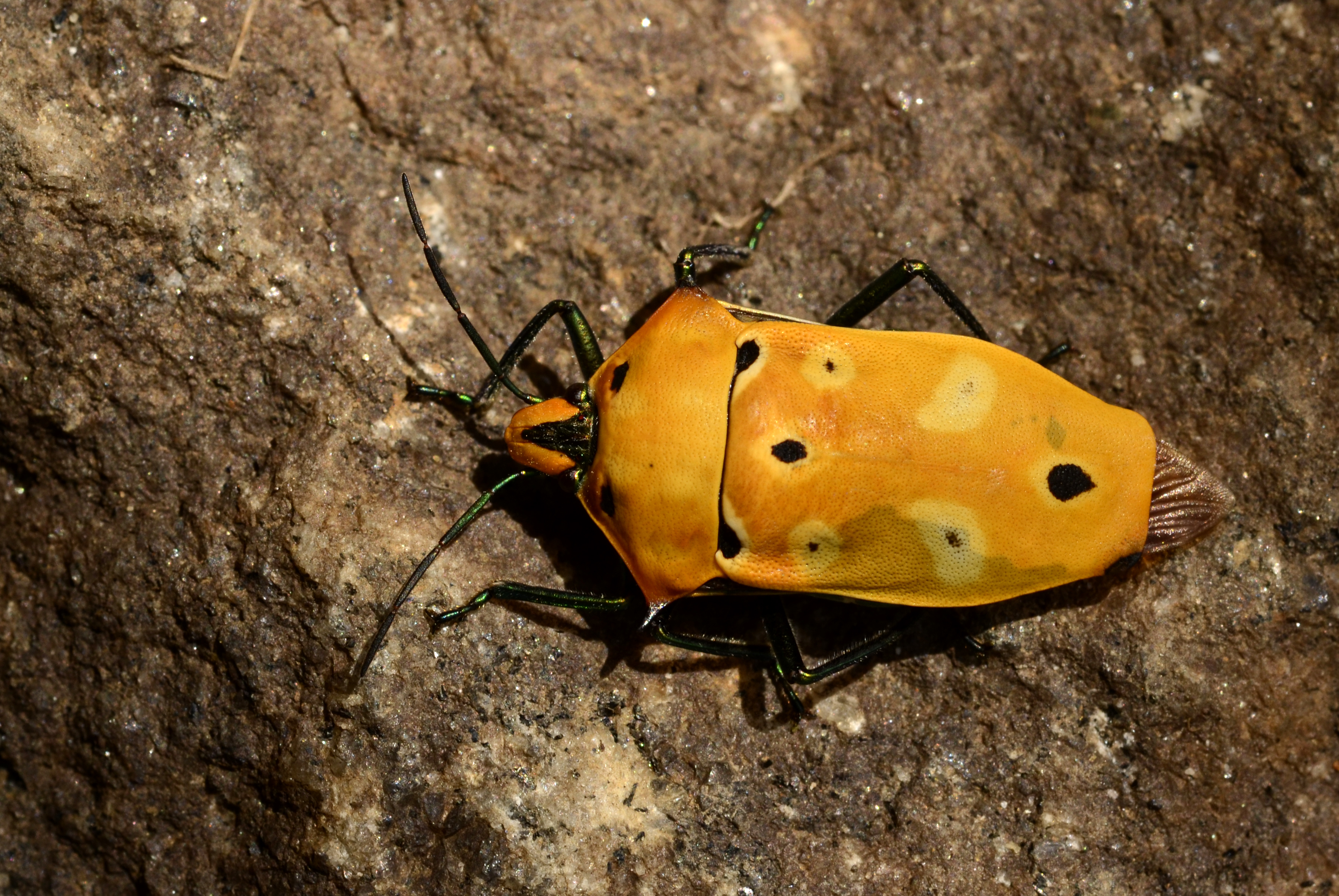
Cantao ocellatus from Anaimalai hills

Cantao ocellatus suck sap from a wide range of plants including Macaranga, Camellia sasanqua, Kigelia, Mallotus, Bischofia javanica and Broussonetia papyrifera.
