= Sodalis (bacterium) =

Scientific classification
- Domain: Bacteria
- Kingdom: Pseudomonadati
- Phylum: Pseudomonadota
- Class: Gammaproteobacteria
- Order: Enterobacterales
- Family: Pectobacteriaceae
- Genus: Sodalis; Dale and Maudlin 1999

Species
- Sodalis glossinidius; Candidatus Sodalis pierantonius; Candidatus Sodalis melophagi; Sodalis praecaptivus; Sodalis ligni

Genus of bacteria

Sodalis is a genus of bacteria within the family Pectobacteriaceae. This genus contains several insect endosymbionts and also a free-living group. It is studied due to its potential use in the biological control of the tsetse fly. Sodalis is an important model for evolutionary biologists because of its nascent endosymbiosis with insects.

== Occurrence and ecological significance ==
Sodalis was described in louse fly (Craterina melbae), in stinkbug (Cantao ocellatus) in Louse (Columbicola columbae) and in other ectoparasites of water mammals (like Proechinophthirus fluctus, Louse).

Species Candidatus Sodalis melophagi was described in sheep ked (Melophagus ovinus).

Another species Candidatus Sodalis pierantonius str. SOPE is known as endosymbiont of rice weevil (Sitophilus oryzae) and can supply rice weevil with essential vitamins like pantothenic acid, riboflavin, and biotin.

A species of bacteria within this genera, Sodalis glossinidius, was found in the hemolymph of the tsetse fly (Glossina morsitans). This bacteria has been used in paratransgenesis approaches to fight sleeping sickness. Genome analysis shows that symbiosis between Sodalis glossinidius and tsetse fly is evolutionary young. Sodalis has large genome and pseudogenes which remain, however, active in cell-free culture. Fly cleared from its native symbionts can be successfully repopulated by Sodalis from other fly species. This might be used in potential biological control of tsetse fly.

== Free-living species ==
The Sodalis bacterium has also been identified as free-living with no association to insects.

Sodalis praecaptivus, was isolated from a hand injured by a tree branch.

Sodalis ligni was found to be widely associated with decomposing wood of various tree species. S. ligni, unlike other Sodalis species, contains nitrogen fixation genes. Such ecological trait might be important for other saprotrophs living in deadwood as this habitat is nitrogen-limited.

Compared to endosymbionts, free-living Sodalis species are characterized by larger genomes, longer genes, and fewer pseudogenes. These characteristics point to asymbiotic lifestyle of these species. Due to known free-living species and related endosymbionts with evolutionarily young link to insect, the whole genus is important for studies about development of the insect endosymbiosis.
