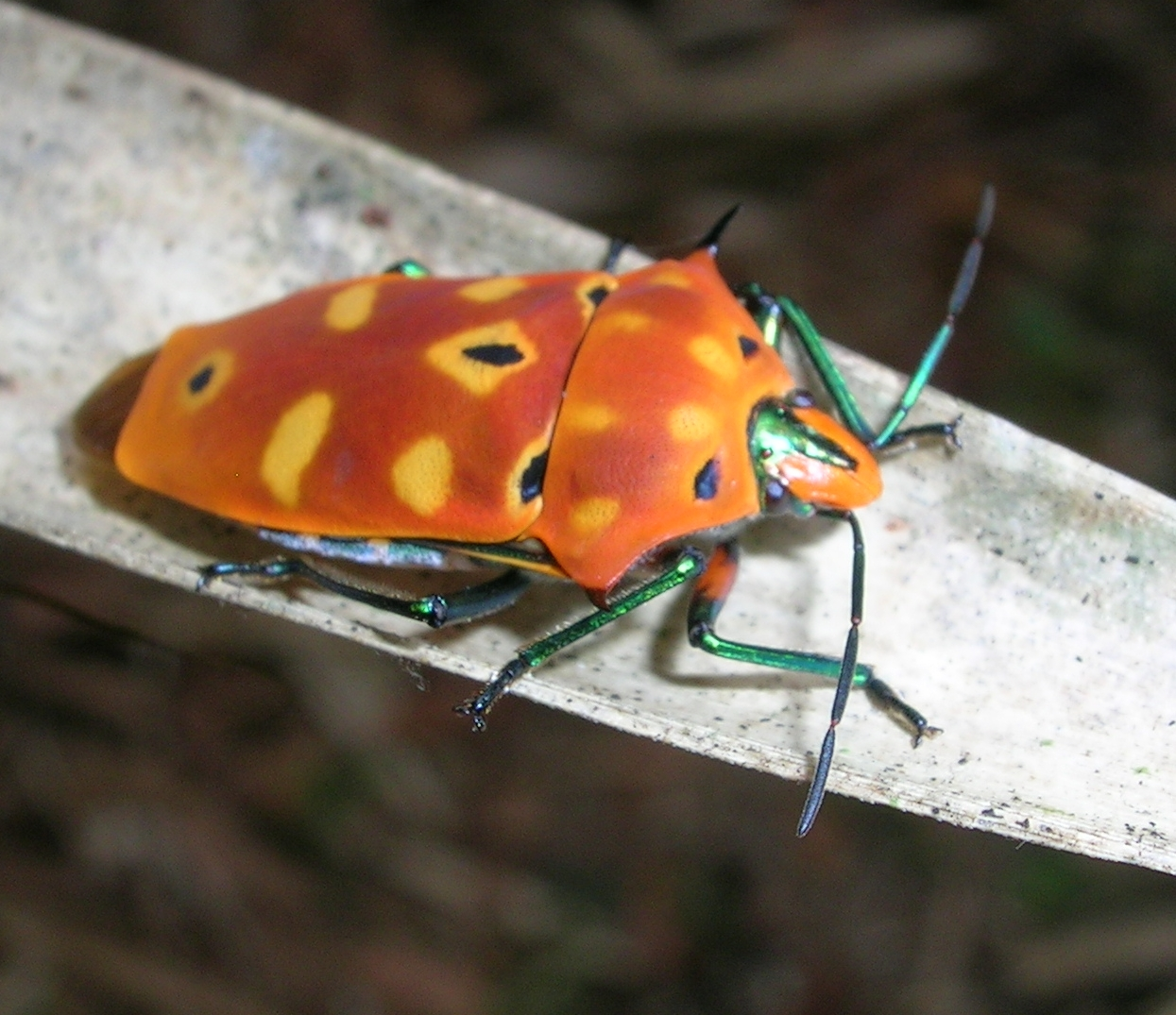
- Cantao ocellatus

Scientific classification
- Kingdom: Animalia
- Phylum: Arthropoda
- Class: Insecta
- Order: Hemiptera
- Suborder: Heteroptera
- Family: Scutelleridae
- Tribe: Scutellerini
- Genus: Cantao; Amyot & Serville, 1843

Species
- see text

= Cantao (bug) =

Genus of true bugs

Cantao is a genus of true bugs in family Scutelleridae and tribe Scutellerini.

== Description ==
Body elongate oval; head elongate, with nearly straight and carinate lateral margins; pronotum with posterolateral angles produced at base of scutellum; scutellum with a pair of deep foveae basally; peritreme large, occupying most of metapleurite, evaporatorium reduced.

== Distribution ==
Distributed in Indomalaya, Wallacea, New Guinea and Australia. A doubtful species (Cantao africanus) has been reported from tropical Africa. A fossil species (tentatively placed into Cantao) was described from the middle Miocene of Tottori Prefecture, Honshu, Japan.

== Species ==
As of February 2024, BioLib includes:

1. Cantao africanus Horváth, 1892
2. Cantao ocellatus (Thunberg, 1784)
3. Cantao purpuratus (Westwood, 1837)
4. Cantao parentum (White, 1839)
5. Cantao variabilis (Montrouzier, 1855)
6. † ?Cantao yamanai Fujiyama, 1967 (fossil)
