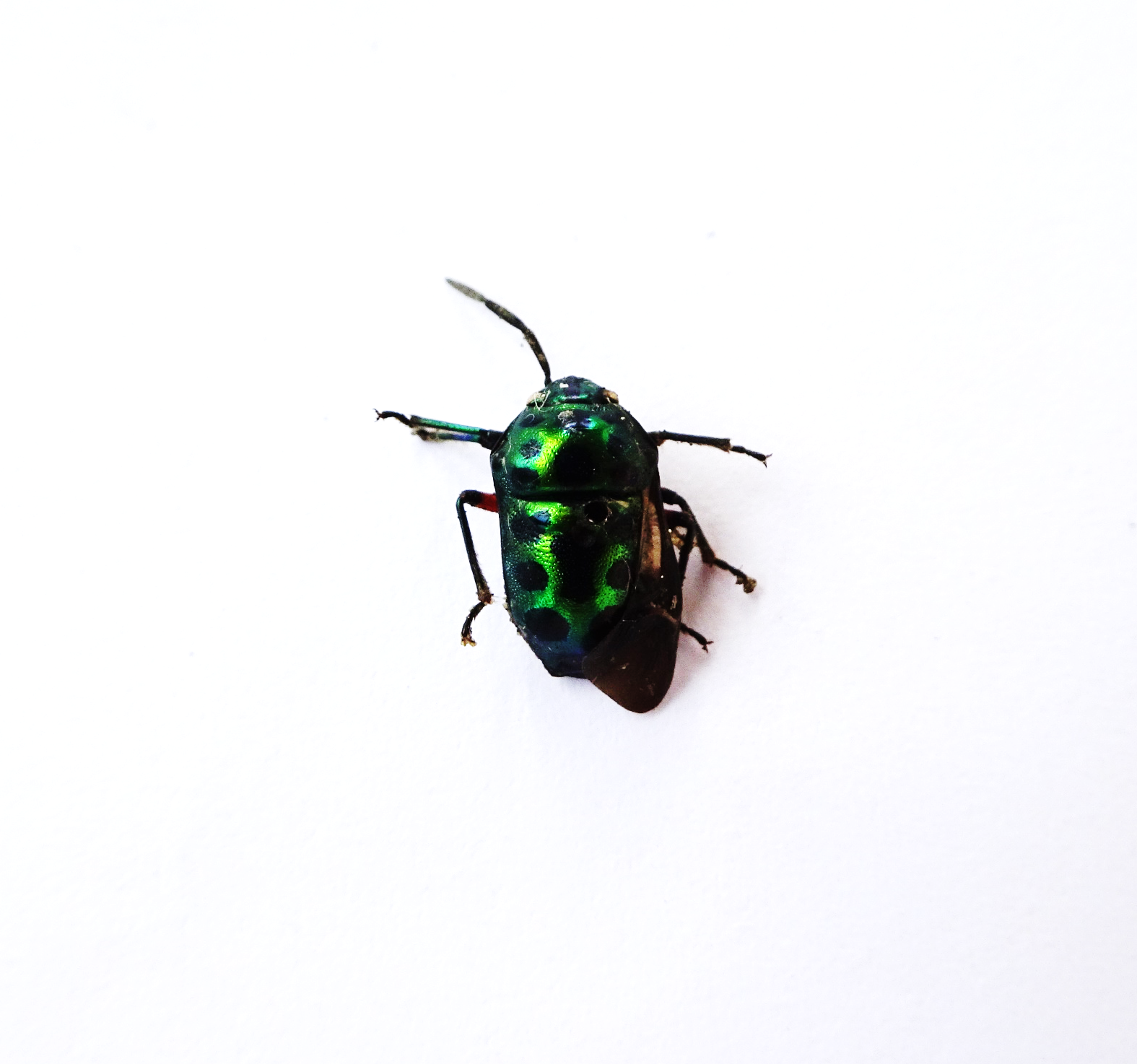
- Dorsal view

Scientific classification
- Domain: Eukaryota
- Kingdom: Animalia
- Phylum: Arthropoda
- Class: Insecta
- Order: Hemiptera
- Suborder: Heteroptera
- Family: Scutelleridae
- Genus: Chrysocoris
- Species: C. patricius

Binomial name
- Chrysocoris patricius (Fabricius, 1798)

Synonyms
- Callidea basilica Germar, 1839; Callidea bengalensis Westwood, 1837; Cimex patricius Fabricius, 1798

= Chrysocoris patricius =

Species of true bug

Chrysocoris patricius is a jewel bug in the family Scutelleridae. It is the smallest known species from the genus Chrysocoris.

== Description ==
The adult has a 9–11 mm long and 4–5 mm wide body. It has a shiny green body color with bluish reflection and five segmented antennae. The II segment is the shortest, and I segment doesn't cross the head. Its Pronotum has 10 shiny black spots; 2 in the central line are larger and bolder. Scutellum has 8 bold spots, the central one is large and shield shaped surrounded by other smaller ones. Its Connexivum is pinkish and its legs are pubescent. The coxae and femurs (except apices) are brownish, with the apices of femurs and rest of the parts black. The ventral side of its head is ochraceous and its sternums are black. Abdominal sternites are ochreous with black patches sideward. Center of III, IV and last abdominal sternites black.

== Distribution ==
Nepal, India, Myanmar.

== Host plants ==
Rice; Santalum album; Maize; Jatropha, Lucern, Sesamum indicum, Chickpea, Soybean, Fenugreek, Cowpea, Hollyhock, Potato, Cucurbits, Mint, Mango, Sorghum.
