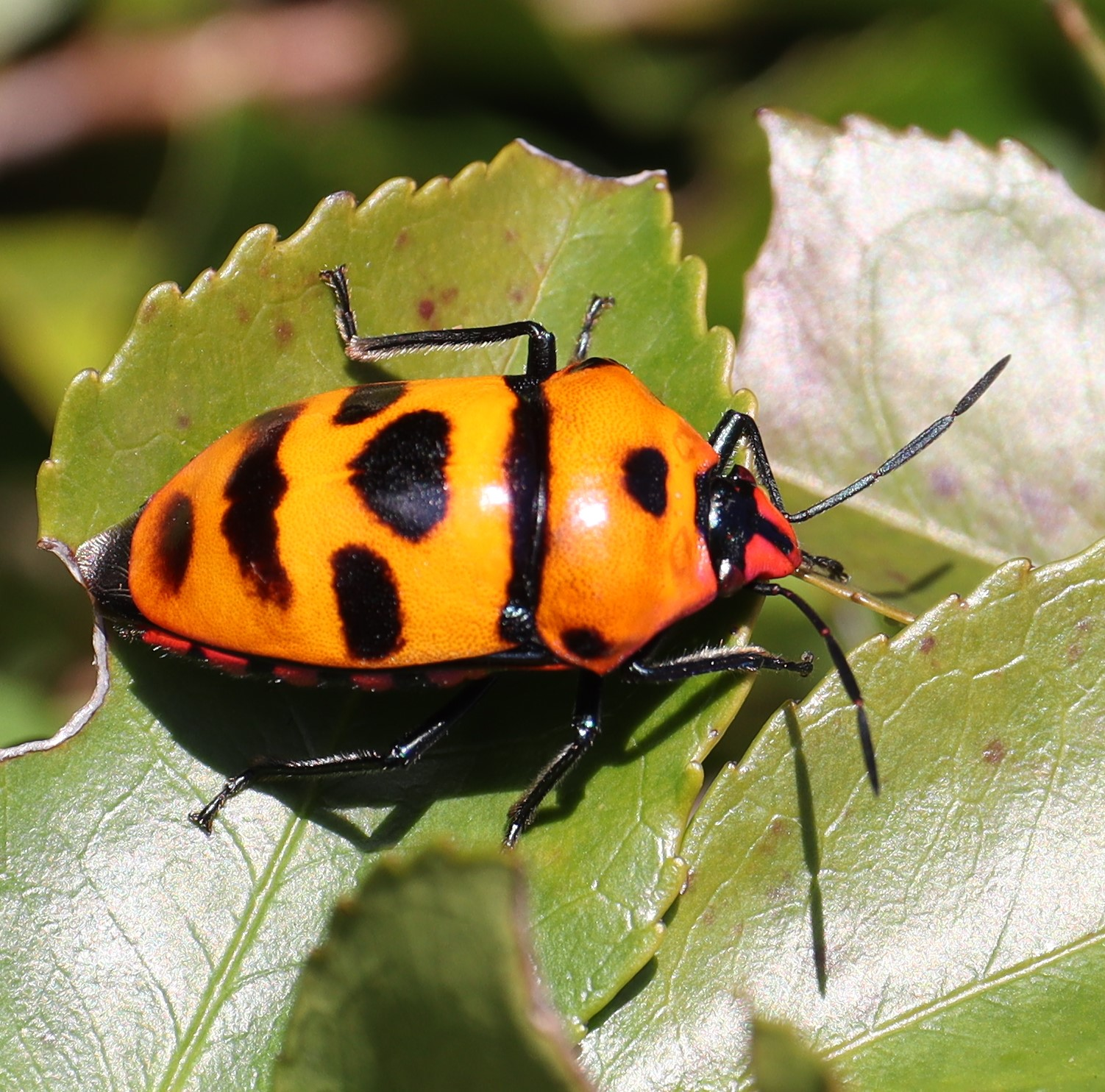

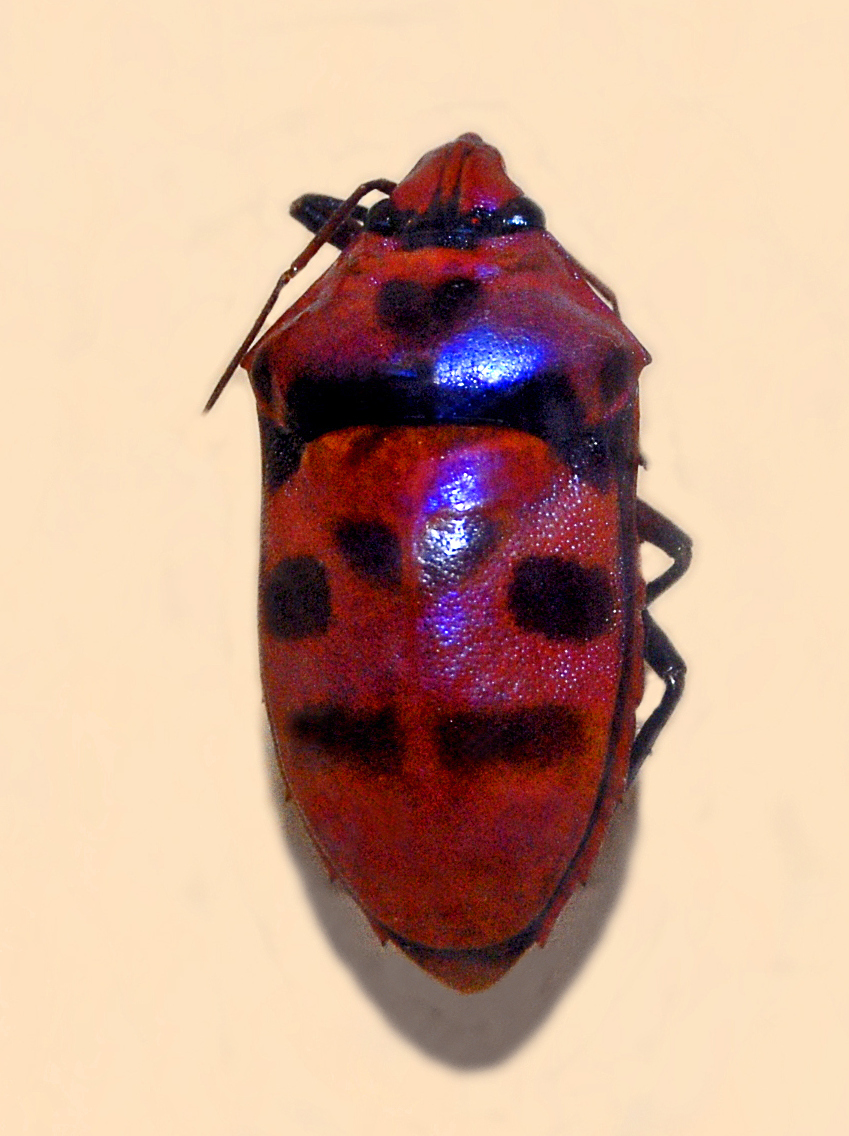
- Pinned specimen from Nias Island

Scientific classification
- Domain: Eukaryota
- Kingdom: Animalia
- Phylum: Arthropoda
- Class: Insecta
- Order: Hemiptera
- Suborder: Heteroptera
- Family: Scutelleridae
- Genus: Eucorysses
- Species: E. grandis

Binomial name
- Eucorysses grandis (Thunberg, 1783)

Synonyms
- Cimex grandis Thunberg, 1783; Cimex baro Fabricius, 1798; Callidea distinguenda Uhler, 1861; Calliphara iris Germar, 1839; Chrysocoris grandis (Thunberg, 1783); Chrysocoris iris (Germar, 1839); Eucorysses superbus Uhler, 1860

= Eucorysses grandis =

Species of true bug

Eucorysses grandis is a species of shield-backed bugs belonging to the tribe Scutellerini.

== Description ==
These shield-backed bugs are variable, sometimes cream-coloured or orange to purplish-red with bluish reflections and black spots.

== Distribution ==
This species is present in India, China, Japan through to Malesia.
