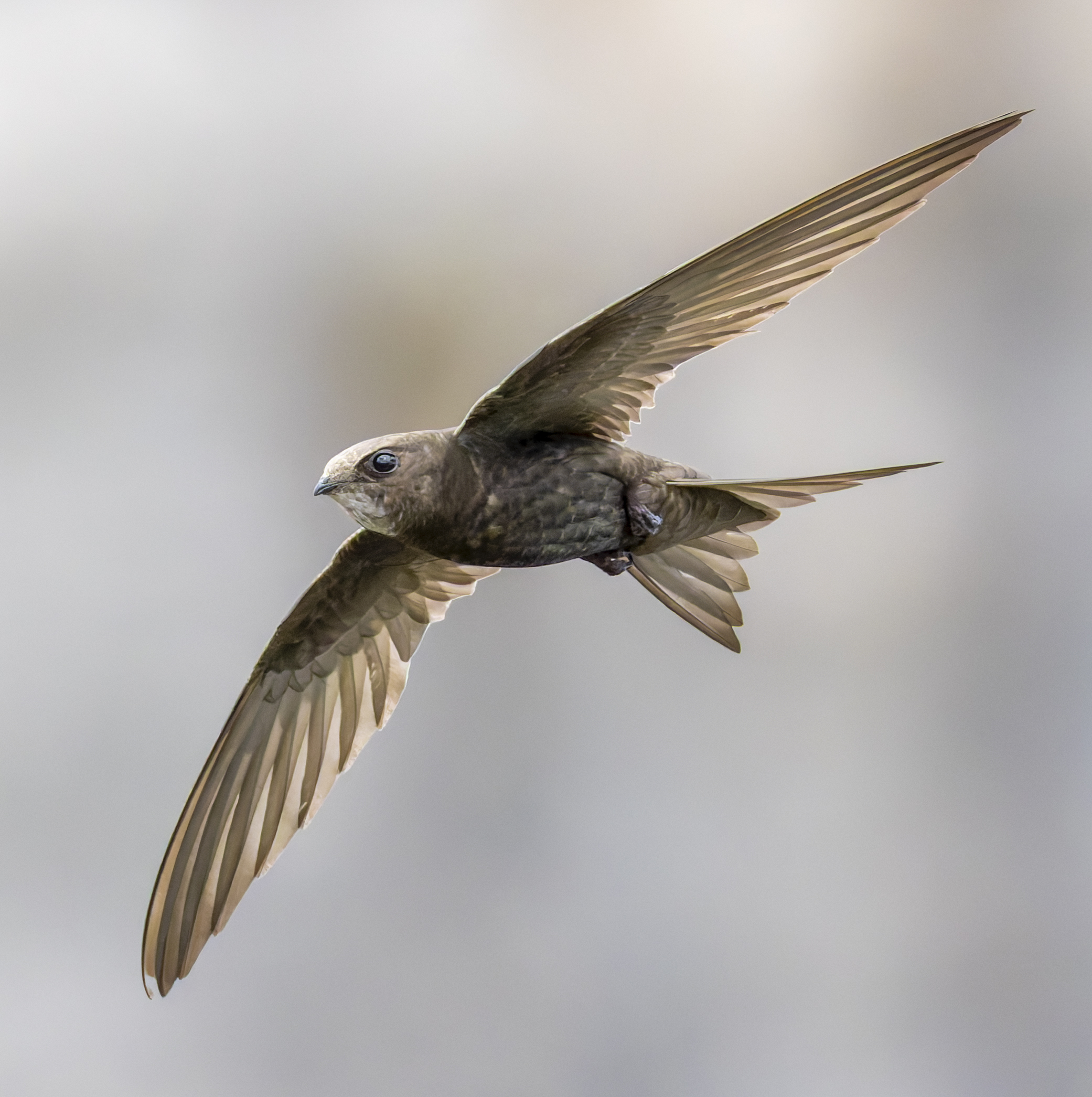
- In Balazuc, France

Conservation status
- Least Concern (IUCN 3.1)

- Near Threatened (IUCN 3.1) (Europe)

Scientific classification
- Kingdom: Animalia
- Phylum: Chordata
- Class: Aves
- Order: Apodiformes
- Family: Apodidae
- Genus: Apus
- Species: A. apus

Binomial name
- Apus apus (Linnaeus, 1758)
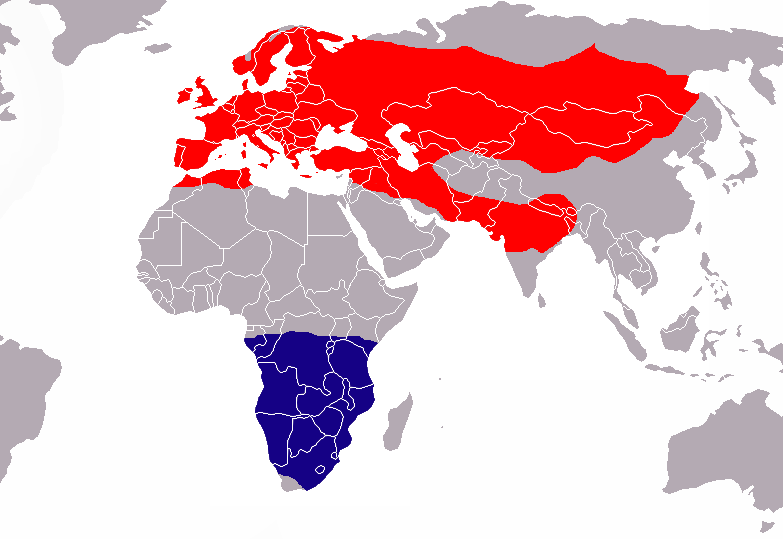
- Range of A. apus Breeding range Wintering range

Synonyms
- Hirundo apus Linnaeus, 1758; Cypselus apus

= Common swift =

Species of bird

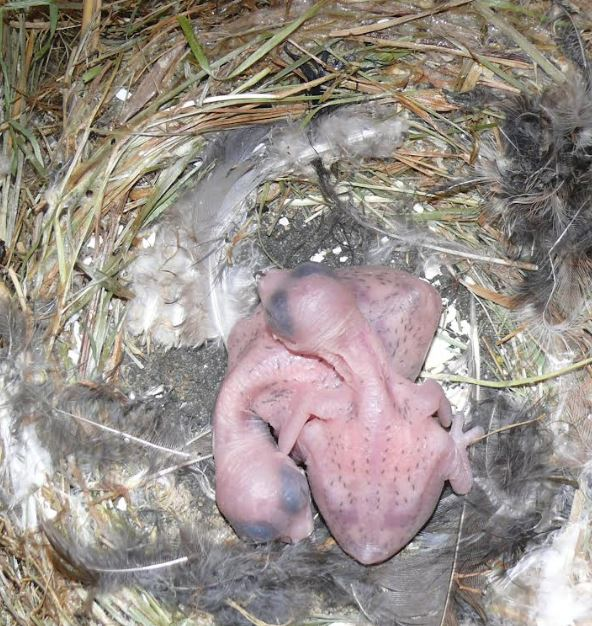
Common Swift chicks

The common swift (Apus apus) is a medium-sized bird, superficially similar to the barn swallow or house martin but somewhat larger, though not stemming from those passerine species, being in the order Apodiformes. The resemblances between the groups are due to convergent evolution, reflecting similar contextual development. The swifts' nearest relatives are the New World hummingbirds and the Southeast Asian treeswifts.

Its scientific name Apus is Latin for a swift, thought by the ancients to be a type of swallow with no feet (from Ancient Greek α, a, "without", and πούς, pous, "foot").

Swifts have very short legs which they use primarily for clinging to vertical surfaces (hence the German name Mauersegler, literally meaning "wall-glider"). They never settle voluntarily on the ground where they would be vulnerable to accidents and predation, and non-breeding individuals may spend up to ten months in continuous flight.

== Taxonomy ==
The common swift was one of the many species described by the Swedish naturalist Carl Linnaeus in 1758 in the tenth edition of his Systema Naturae. He introduced the binomial name Hirundo apus. The current genus Apus was erected by the Italian naturalist Giovanni Antonio Scopoli in 1777 based on tautonymy. The word apus is the Latin word for a swift. It is derived from the Ancient Greek α, a, "without", and πούς, pous, "foot", based on the belief that these birds were a form of swallow that lacked feet.

A Central European subspecies which lived during the last ice age has been described as Apus apus palapus.

== Description ==
Common swifts are 16–17 cm (6.3–6.7 in) long with a wingspan of 38–40 cm (15–16 in) and entirely blackish-brown except for a small white or pale grey patch on their chins which is not visible from a distance. They have a short forked tail and very long swept-back wings that resemble a crescent or a boomerang.

Their call is a loud scream in two different tone pitches, the higher of which issues from the female. They often form "screaming parties" during summer evenings, when 10–20 swifts will gather in flight around their nesting area, calling out and being answered by nesting swifts. Larger "screaming parties" are formed at higher altitudes, especially late in the breeding season. Radar tracking of swifts at their breeding colonies has revealed that they often move together in flocks during their evening ascent and their dawn descent, but fly separately during the subsequent evening descent and the prior dawn ascent, suggesting that this flocking benefits the swifts via cue acquisition and information exchange between individuals or through extending social behaviour.

== Behaviour ==
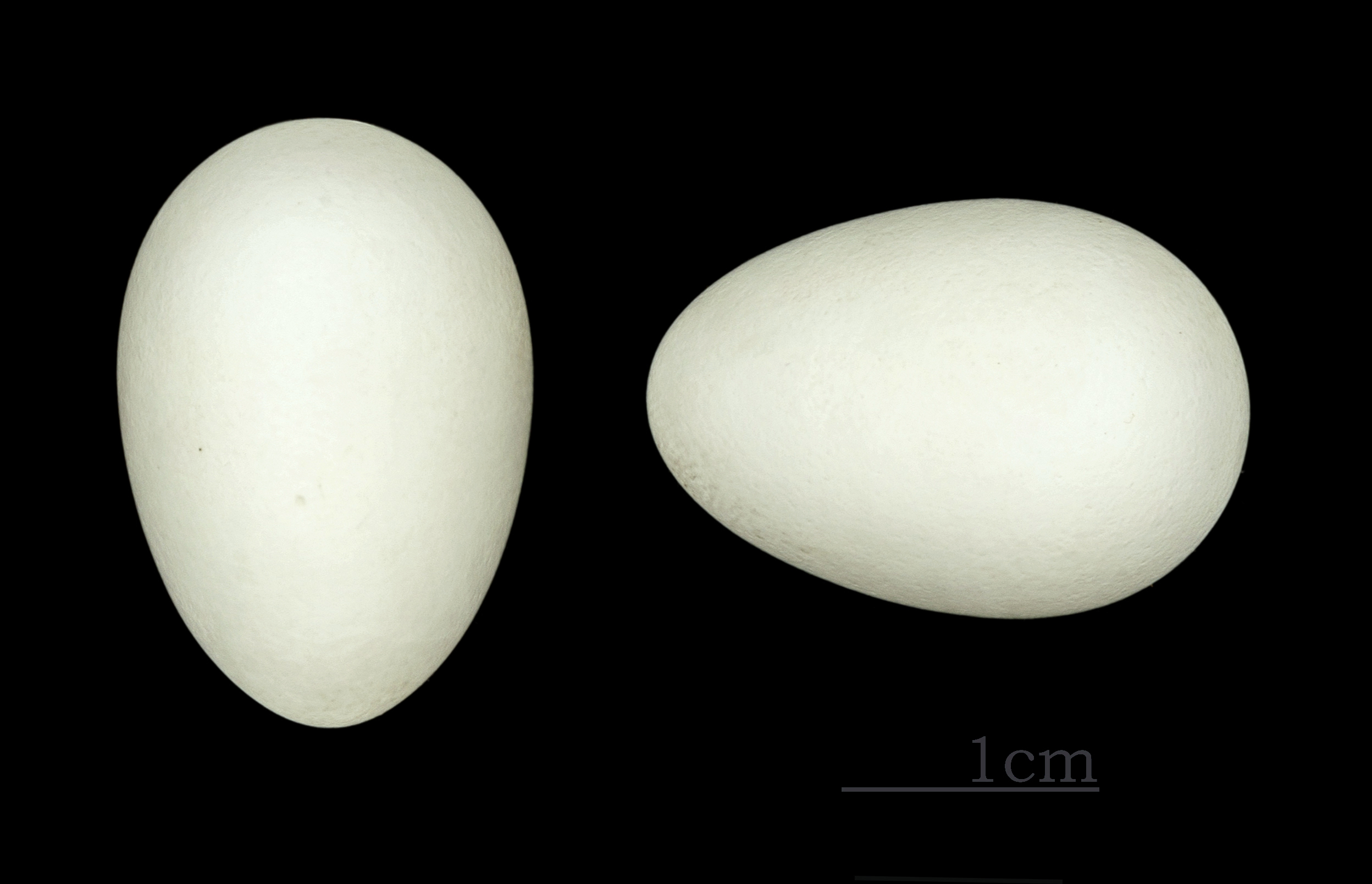
Eggs of Apus apus

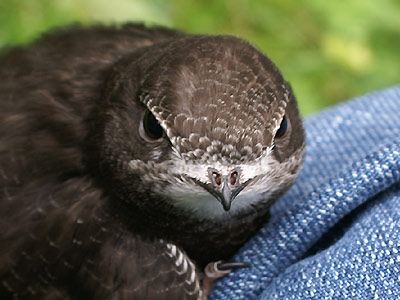
Young bird, not yet able to fly

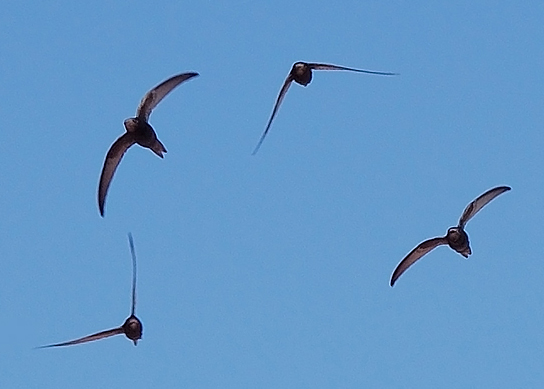
Several swifts flying

Swifts in flight, Tomaszów Mazowiecki, Poland

Swifts may nest in former woodpecker tree burrows found in ancient forests, such as some 600 reported nesting in the Białowieża Forest of North Eastern Poland, or the small colony found in a combination of woodpecker holes and tree nestboxes on the RSPB's reserve at the Caledonian Forest in Abernethy, Scotland. While tree holes and cliffs may have comprised their historical nesting resource, the almost complete removal of ancient forest from their nesting range has resulted in adaptation to man-made sites. Swifts build their nests of air-borne material caught in flight, bonded with their saliva, in suitable buildings hollows, such as under tiles, in gaps beneath window sills, and most typically under eaves and within gables.

Swifts form pairs that may couple for years, and often return to the same nesting site and partner year after year, repairing degradation suffered in their 40-week migratory absence. Insects such as clothes moths, carpet and larder beetles may consume all but the most indigestible nest elements, typically feather shafts.

Young nesting swifts are able to survive for a few days without food by dropping their body temperature and metabolic rate, entering a torpid state.

Except when nesting, swifts spend their lives in the air, living on the insects caught in flight; they drink, feed, and often mate and sleep on the wing. Some individuals go 10 months without landing. No other bird spends as much of its life in flight. Contrary to common belief, swifts can take flight from level ground. Their maximum horizontal flying speed is 111.6 km/h (69.3 mph) Over a lifetime they can cover millions of miles (or kilometers).

Feeding parties can be very large in insect-rich areas, such as wetlands. Reports of as many as 2,000 swifts feeding over flooded gravel pits, lakes and marshy river deltas are not uncommon, and may represent an ingress of swifts from within as much as a 100 km (62 mi) radius; swifts nesting in Western Scotland are thought to venture to Lough Neagh in Northern Ireland to feed on the abundant and nutritious "Lough Neagh Fly".

=== Breeding ===
Common swifts nest in a wider variety of sites than any other species of Apus. Swifts usually nest in buildings but they can also be found nesting in holes in trees, cliffs and crevices, and even in nestboxes. Swifts usually enter their nesting holes with direct flight, and take-off is characterized by an initial free-fall.

=== Distribution ===
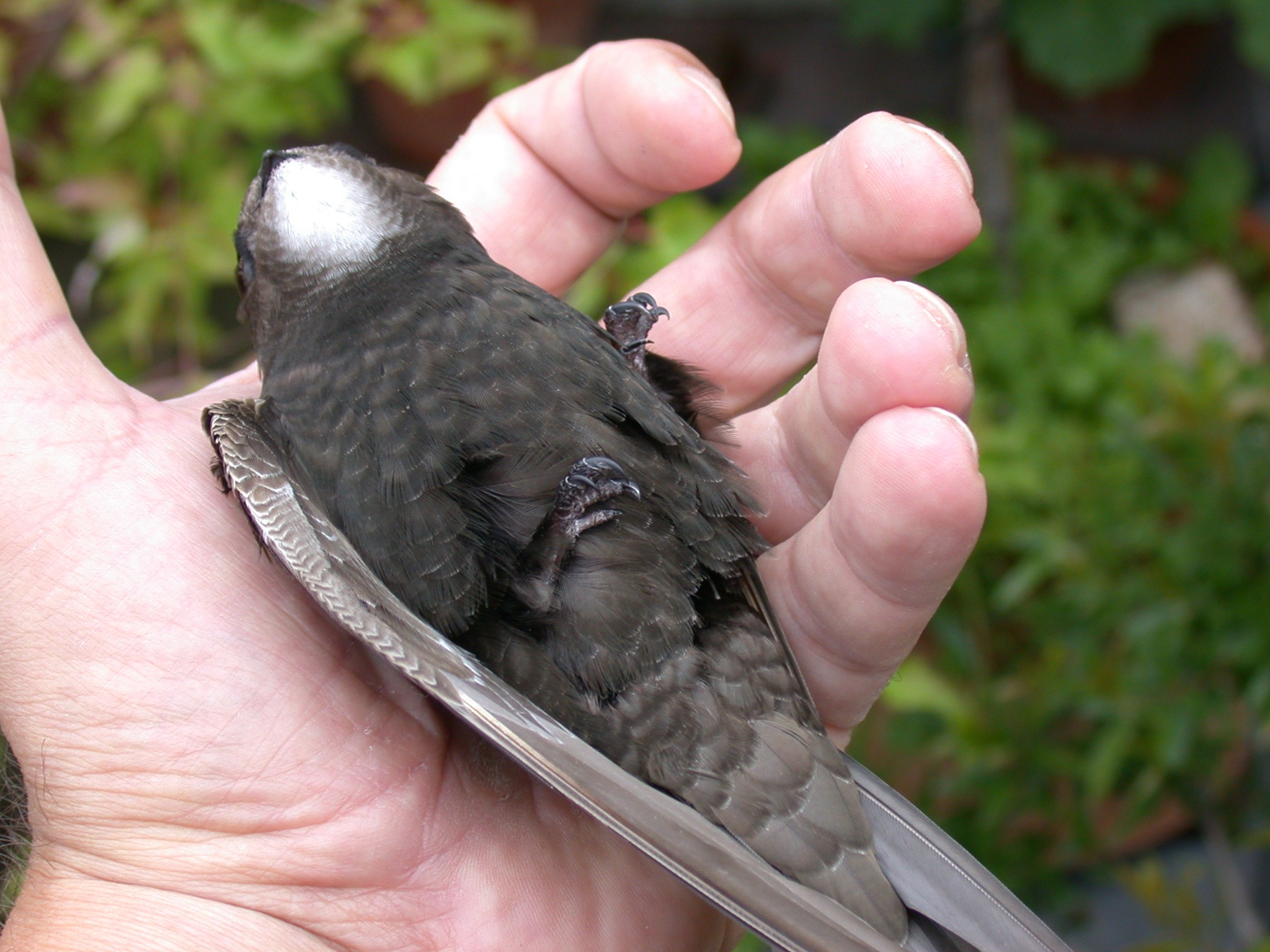
A juvenile, feigning death (thanatosis)

Common swifts are migratory. Their summer breeding range runs from Portugal and Ireland in the West across to China and Siberia in the East. They breed as far south as Northern Africa (in Morocco and Algeria), with a presence in the Middle East in Israel, Lebanon and Syria, the Near East across Turkey, and the whole of Europe as far north as Norway, Finland, and most of sub-Arctic Russia. Swifts migrate to Africa by a variety of routes, ending up in Equatorial and Sub-Equatorial Africa, excluding the Cape. Common swifts do not breed on the Indian Subcontinent. Outside of their normal range, they are rare vagrants in North America, with records mostly originating from the United States and Canada, however; it has also been recorded in Bermuda and Greenland. Common swifts have also been recorded in the Caribbean, including in Bonaire, Barbados, and Puerto Rico. In South America, there are records in Suriname, French Guiana, Brazil, and Colombia.

=== Migration ===
Subjects of a geolocator tracking study demonstrated that swifts breeding in Sweden winter in the Congo region of Africa. Swifts spend three to three-and-a-half months in Africa and a similar time breeding – the rest is spent on the wing, flying home or away. Unsuccessful breeders, fledglings, and sexually immature year-old birds are the first to leave their breeding area. Breeding males follow next, and finally the breeding females. The breeding females stay longer in the nest to rebuild their fat reserves. The time of departure is often determined by the light cycle, and begins at the first day of less than 17 hours light. For this reason, birds further north, for instance in Finland, leave later in the second half of August. These latecomers are rushed through the quickly shortening days in Central Europe and are barely seen by bird watchers.

The prevailing direction of travel through Central Europe is south-by-southwest, and so the Alps do not present a barrier. In bad weather, the swifts follow rivers, because they can find a better food supply there. The population of Western and Central Europe traverses the Iberian peninsula and northwestern Africa. Swifts from Russia and southeastern Europe make a long journey over the eastern part of the Mediterranean. It is unclear where the two groups meet. The eastern population, which breeds in Eastern Europe and Russia, follows a migration route through the Eastern Mediterranean and the Levant. Along this corridor, the birds utilize several key geographical landmarks for foraging and navigation, including Turkey, the Lebanese mountains, and Israel. In these regions, the Great Rift Valley serves as a vital aerial highway, providing abundant insect life that sustains the swifts before they cross into Egypt and continue toward their wintering grounds in southeastern Africa The western group of swifts mostly follow the Atlantic coastline of Africa – otherwise they would have to cross the Sahara. Once they arrive at the humid savanna, they turn southeast to arrive at their winter feeding grounds. During the summer in Africa, there is a great bounty of insects for the swifts, since the region lies in the Intertropical Convergence Zone. The swifts have a nearly unbroken presence in the sky.

A few swifts, usually some of the sexually immature one year olds, remain in Africa. The majority fly northwards through Africa, then turn east towards their destinations. The birds use low pressure fronts during their spring migrations to exploit the southwestern flow of warm air, and on the return trip, ride northeastern winds on the back of the low pressure fronts.

In Central Europe, the swifts return in the second half of April and the first third of May, and like to stay in lowlands and near water rather than in high places. In more northerly regions, the swifts arrive later. The weather along the journey has an enormous influence on the arrival date, so in one region the swifts may come back at varying times year to year.

== Differences between swifts and swallows ==
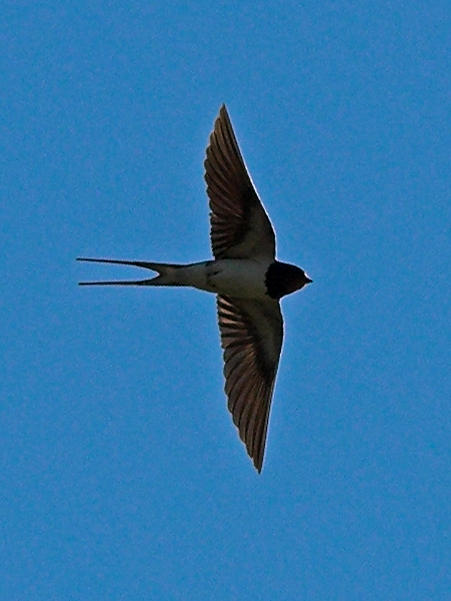
Barn swallow

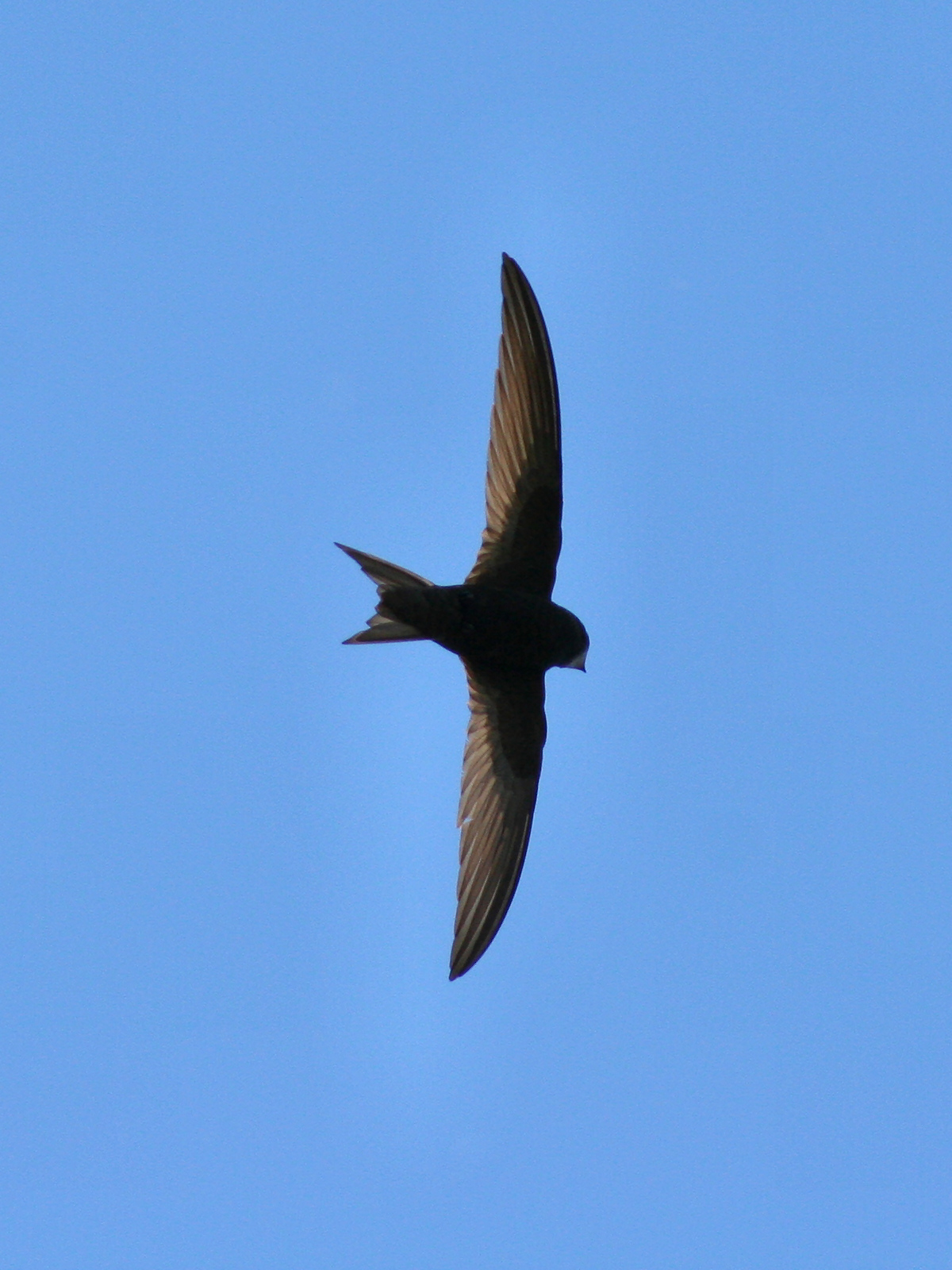
Swift

The barn swallow and house martin hunt for airborne insects in a manner similar to that of the slightly larger swift, and occasionally mixed groups of the species form. The most noticeable differences between the three types are:

- The shrill screaming call of the swift distinguishes itself from the more inconspicuous babbling of the swallow.
- The narrow sickle-shaped wings of the swift are longer than its body, and its silhouette in the air resembles an anchor.
- The swift's wingbeats are deep and quick, and the swift glides for longer. The swallow's flight is more fluttering, and it presses its wings further to the rear during beats.
- Although sometimes difficult to discern against a bright sky, the underside of a swift, with the exception of the white spot under its chin, is entirely dark brown. Swallows show a beige-white underside. They can also be recognized by the long forks in their tails.

== Parasites ==
Swift nests commonly support populations of the chewing louse Dennyus hirundinis and the lousefly Crataerina pallida.

== In culture ==
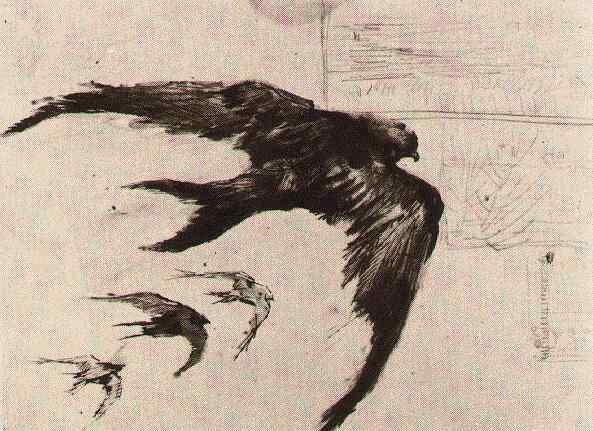
Four Swifts with Landscape Sketches, by Vincent van Gogh (Paris, April-September 1887)

In medieval Italy, swifts (rondone) were encouraged to nest in towers and buildings using rondonare, holes left in the wall and special constructions under the eaves of buildings. Young birds were harvested for eating but there were rules about leaving at least one young in the nest.

The heraldic bird known as the "martlet", which is represented without feet, may have been based on the swift, but is generally assumed to refer to the house martin; it was used for the arms of younger sons, perhaps because it symbolized their landless wandering.

== See also ==
- International Swift Conference
- Unihemispheric slow-wave sleep
