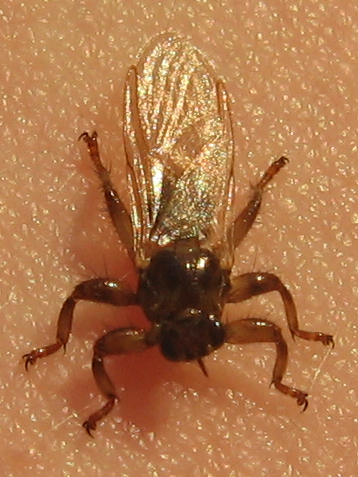
- Lipoptena cervi

Scientific classification
- Kingdom: Animalia
- Phylum: Arthropoda
- Clade: Pancrustacea
- Class: Insecta
- Order: Diptera
- Family: Hippoboscidae
- Subfamily: Lipopteninae

= Lipopteninae =

Subfamily of flies

Lipopteninae is a subfamily of the fly family Hippoboscidae. All are parasitic.

== Systematics ==
- Genus Lipoptena Nitzsch, 1818

- L. arianae Maa, 1969
- L. axis Maa, 1969
- L. binoculus (Speiser, 1908)
- L. capreoli Rondani, 1878
- L. cervi (Linnaeus, 1758)
- L. chalcomleaena Speiser, 1904
- L. couturieri Séguy, 1935
- L. depressa

- L. depressa depressa (Say, 1823)
- L. depressa pacifica Maa, 1969

- L. doszhanovi Grunin, 1974
- L. efovea Speiser, 1905
- L. fortisetosa Maa, 1965
- L. grahami Bequaert, 1942
- L. guimaraesi Bequaert, 1957
- L. hopkinsi Bequaert, 1942
- L. iniqua Maa, 1969
- L. japonica Bequaert, 1942
- L. mazamae Rondani, 1878
- L. nirvana Maa, 1969
- L. paradoxa Newstead, 1907
- L. pauciseta Edwards, 1919
- L. pteropi Denny, 1843
- L. pudui Peterson & Maa, 1970
- L. rusaecola Bequaert, 1942
- L. saepes Maa, 1969
- L. saltatrix Maa, 1969
- L. sepiacea Speiser, 1905
- L. sigma Maa, 1965
- L. sikae Mogi, 1975
- L. timida Maa, 1969
- L. weidneri Maa, 1969

- Genus Melophagus Latreille, 1802

- M. antilopes (Pallas, 1777)
- M. ovinus

- M. ovinus ovinus (Linnaeus, 1758)
- M. ovinus himalayae Maa, 1969

- M. rupicaprinus Rondani, 1879

- Genus Neolipoptena Bequaert, 1942

- N. ferrisi Bequaert, 1935
