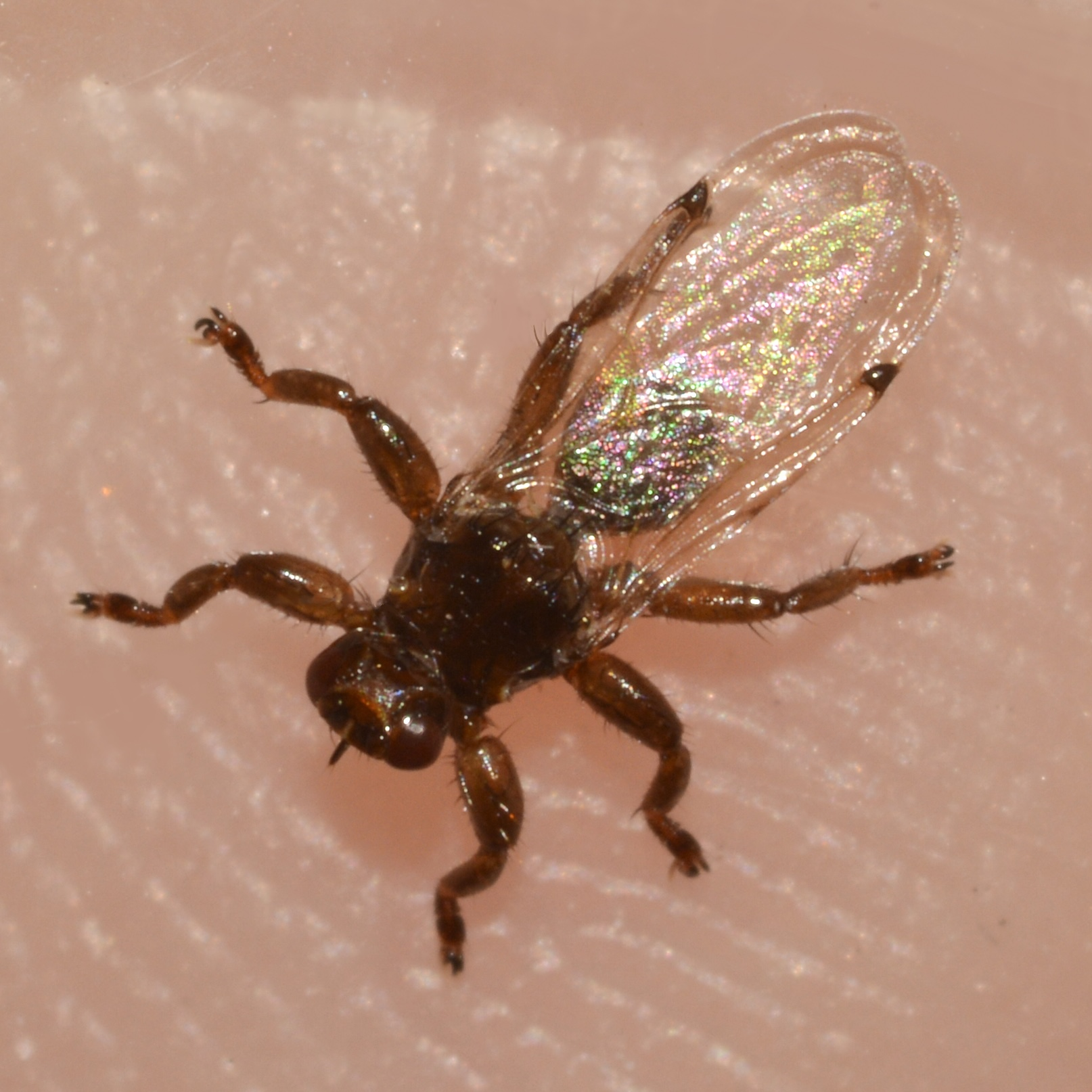
- Lipoptena depressa, with wings

Scientific classification
- Kingdom: Animalia
- Phylum: Arthropoda
- Clade: Pancrustacea
- Class: Insecta
- Order: Diptera
- Family: Hippoboscidae
- Subfamily: Lipopteninae
- Genus: Lipoptena
- Species: L. depressa

Binomial name
- Lipoptena depressa (Say, 1823)

Synonyms
- Melophagus depressa Say, 1823

= Lipoptena depressa =

Species of insect

Lipoptena depressa, or the Western American deer ked, is species of fly in the family Hippoboscidae. The flies are blood-feeding ectoparasites of mule deer, Odocoileus hemionus and white-tailed deer, Odocoileus virginianus. They are found in the western United States and Canada.

== Life cycle ==
The female fly will produce a single larva at a time, retaining the larva internally for all three instars. She then gives birth to the pre-pupal third-instar larva which promptly pupates and falls from the host deer.

When the fly has completed its metamorphosis, the winged adult emerges and begins searching for a host. Adults can only fly approximately 50 meters, so their success depends on the density and distribution of the host mammals. Once the fly has found a suitable host, it sheds its wings. The rest of its lifecycle, including reproduction, occurs on the host.

== Distribution and identification ==
Lipoptena depressa is found in the western part of the United States including Washington, Oregon, California, Idaho, Montana, South Dakota, Colorado, and Utah as well as Alberta, Canada. The two other closely related species found in North America are Lipoptena cervi, originally from Europe but now found in the northeastern US and eastern Canada, and Lipoptena mazamae, found in the southeastern U.S., Central America and South America.

Lipoptena depressa is occasionally misidentified as Ixodes scapularis (deer tick); while both of them are blood-feeding mammal parasites, Lipoptena depressa is an insect, whereas ticks are Arachnids. Counting the number of legs (6 for insects, 8 for arachnids) can distinguish them from each other. Ticks are much more common than deer keds, and they are able to thrive on a variety of mammals, including humans and dogs. Contrastly, L. depressa is much more host-specific. They do not seek out humans and have only been recorded biting them a few times.

== Effects ==
Lipoptena depressa is not known to be a vector for any disease affecting humans. However, deer keds in the genus are thought to be vectors of diseases in deer, though there is a lack of research in this area. Recent papers bring up the possibility of deer keds spreading diseases due to their expanding range in the face of climate change.

Additionally, white-tailed deer with deer keds may suffer calcaneus hemorrhages which can lead to diseases and even death to the deer. Lipoptena depressa does not feed on humans.
