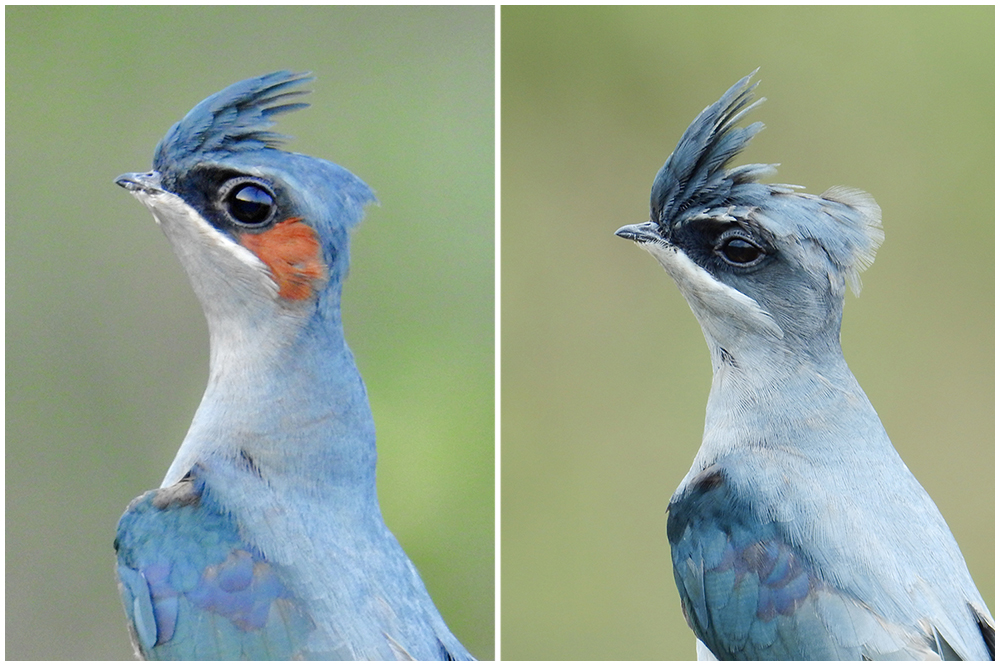
- The male (left) has chestnut ear coverts while the female (right) does not.

Conservation status
- Least Concern (IUCN 3.1)

Scientific classification
- Kingdom: Animalia
- Phylum: Chordata
- Class: Aves
- Order: Apodiformes
- Family: Hemiprocnidae
- Genus: Hemiprocne
- Species: H. coronata

Binomial name
- Hemiprocne coronata (Tickell, 1833)

Synonyms
- Dendrochelidon coronatus Hirundo coronata Tickell, 1833; Hemiprocne longipennis dryas Ripley, 1950; H. l. coronata

= Crested treeswift =

Species of bird

The crested treeswift (Hemiprocne coronata) is a species of tree swift. It was for some time considered the same species as its eastern relative, the gray-rumped treeswift (Hemiprocne longipennis), but they do not interbreed where their ranges overlap. It is distinct in flight, with long, bowed wings and a deeply forked tail that usually appears narrow and pointed.

== Description ==
The crested treeswift is a large slender bird at 23 cm (9 in) length. This species is dove grey above and white below. The long swept-back wings are a darker grey above. This treeswift has a crest and a long, deeply forked tail. The adult male has orange cheeks and ear coverts with a narrow streak of white under the eye and a trace of a white supercilium. The female also has a thin white stripe below the eye running below the grey cheek and ear coverts. Young birds have a dark grey head and wings but the feathers are edged in white and the rest of the soft plumage is much streakier than that of the adults. They are found in small groups that fly in wide circles in open forest, occasionally perching atop a tall and leafless tree. When perched they appear to sit very upright.

The call of this species is a harsh kee-kyew or three note kip-kee-kep with emphasis on the middle note.

== Taxonomy and systematics ==
The species was first given a binomial name with a description by Samuel Tickell in 1833. He collected specimens during his travels in the Borabhum and Dholbhum area while serving as a lieutenant in the 31st regiment of native infantry. He called it Hirundo coronatus and gave it the trivial name of Dhudka Swallow. He noted that it was not found throughout the year. The genus Hemiprocne was erected by Christian Ludwig Nitzsch in 1829 but the species has variously been incorrectly treated in the past in Dendrochelidon and Macropteryx. Jerdon, a quinarian, considered the species to be a link between the swifts and swallows on the basis of their silky plumage, uncharacteristic of the swifts. James L. Peters considered coronata as a subspecies of longipennis but it was reinstated as a full species based on plumage and structural differences (Prigogine's delta or distance between the fourth and fifth tail feather) and distributions of this and longipennis in the restricted sense. Dillon Ripley described a new subspecies dryas from a specimen obtained by Salim Ali from Rajpipla in southern Gujarat. He considered it to be paler grey on the upperparts than the known forms. This is however no longer considered a valid subspecies and represents variation within the widely distributed species.

The genus is the sole member of the tribe Hemiprocnini which is, based on one morphological cladistics, considered to be more derived than the Cypseloidini (while some others have suggested that Hemiprocne is basal) and basal to the Collocaliini and more derived tribes Chaeturini and Apodini. The posterior portion of the sternum has two openings or foramina and the fifth secondary is absent (also known as diastataxic, a character shared with Cypseloides) whereas other swifts have the fifth secondary (and are said to be eutaxic). Like all swifts this species uses saliva to build its nest but it does not have all the toes facing forward as in the Apodini.

== Distribution and habitat ==
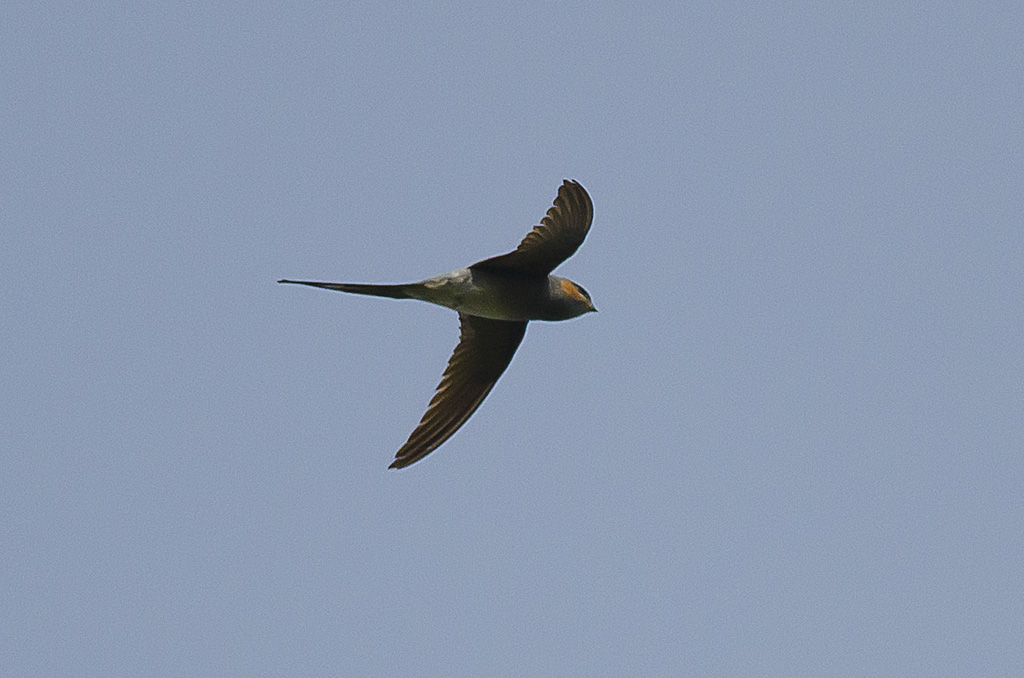
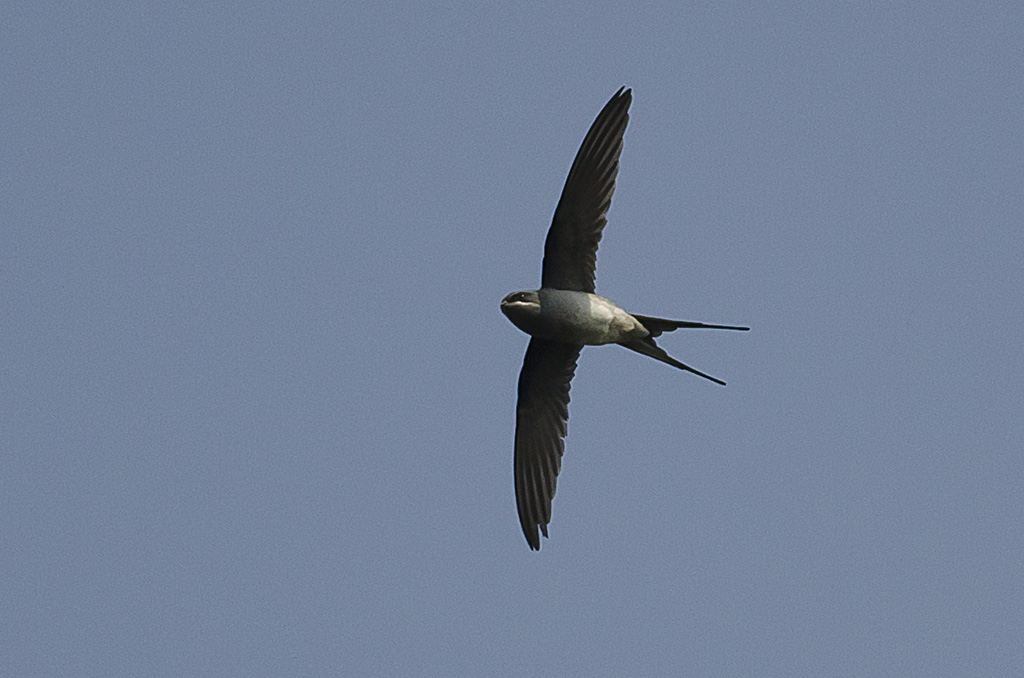
In flight, the tail appears long and pointed and the deep fork may be visible only briefly

The crested treeswift is a common resident breeder from the Indian subcontinent. It is found in India, Sri Lanka, Bhutan, Bangladesh, Nepal, Myanmar, Thailand, Vietnam, Cambodia, Laos and China. These are birds of open woodland and deciduous forests. They are also found in open areas near trees and in parks and gardens. Most birds live in the lowlands below 1000 m.

== Behaviour ==
The crested treeswift builds a tiny and thin-walled and shallow nest made up of pieces of bark and feathers which is glued with saliva to the side of an exposed tree branch. It lays one blue-grey egg which is incubated by both sexes. The nest is so small that incubating birds may just appear as if just normally perched on a branch having a knot. Adults may also sit along the branch when incubating. Nearly half the egg is visible above the edge of the nest and is covered by the down feathers of their breast and belly when incubating. The breeding season is during the hottest part of summer from March to July and nests may be positioned on the eastern side of a branch so that the adult would have the sun on its back during the afternoon. Females were observed to incubate more while males sat nearby or captured insects. The nestlings are cryptically patterned in grey and freeze when threatened with the head held low and beak held slightly upward and appear like a knot on a tree branch or when sitting horizontally appear like a chameleon.

The crested treeswift feeds in the air, capturing insects (including honey bees) on the wing with its bill. They are known to sometimes roost communally.

== Status ==
The crested treeswift has a very large range, the population size seems stable and it is considered relatively common. For these reasons, the IUCN has listed it as being of "Least Concern".
