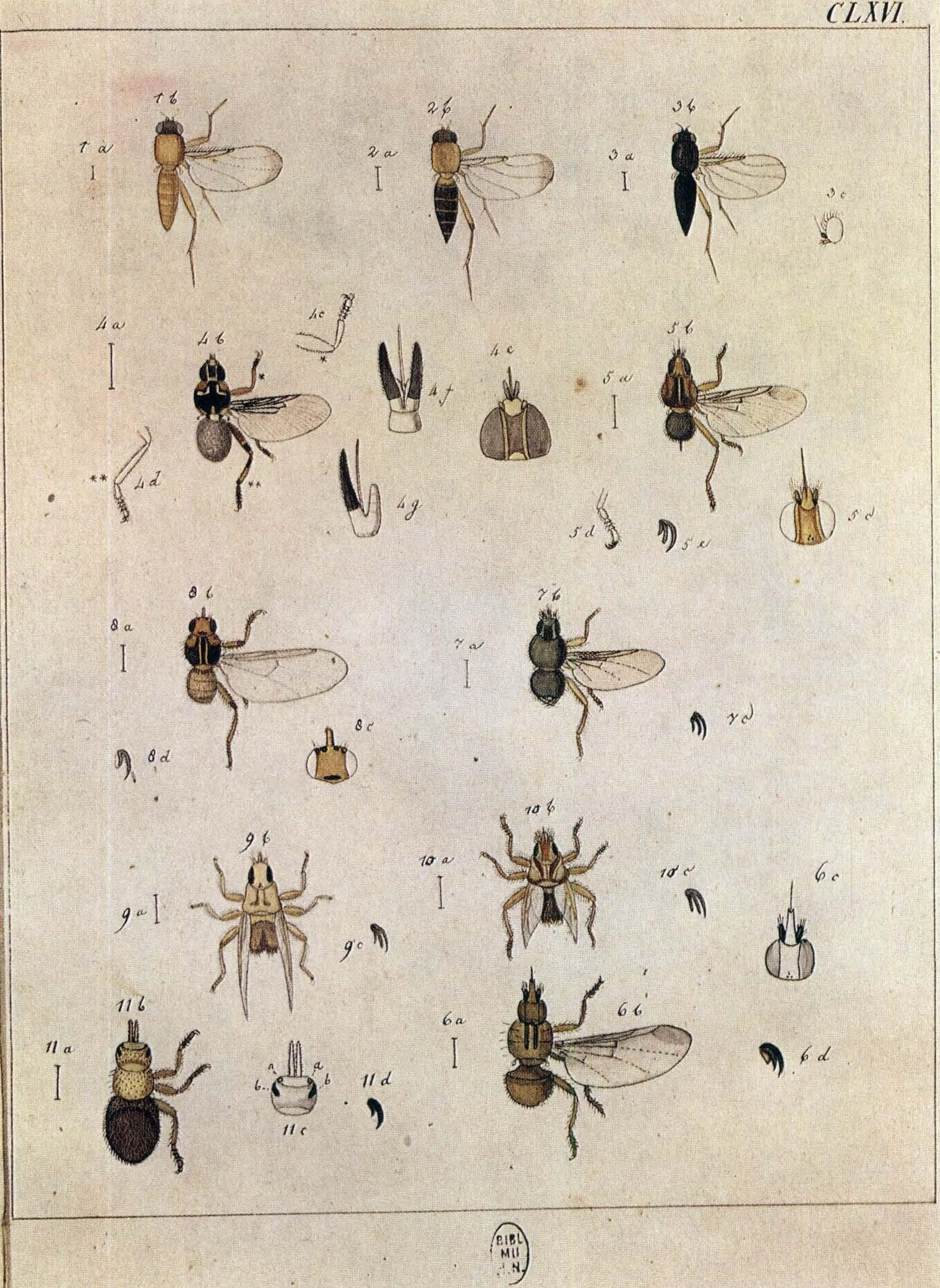
- Melophagus ovinus in Europäischen Zweiflügeligen Fig.11

Scientific classification
- Kingdom: Animalia
- Phylum: Arthropoda
- Class: Insecta
- Order: Diptera
- Family: Hippoboscidae
- Subfamily: Lipopteninae
- Genus: Melophagus; Latreille, 1802

Type species
- Hippobosca ovina Linnaeus, 1758

Synonyms
- Mallophaga Shuckard, 1840; Mallophagus Stiles, 1901; Malophagus Johnson, 1925; Melaphagus Pfeiffer, 1905; Mellophagus Hofmann, 1834; Melophaga von Olfers, 1816; Melophaga Wiedemann, 1830; Melophila Nitzsch, 1818

= Melophagus =

Genus of flies

Melophagus is a genus of flies in the family Hippoboscidae. All are wingless.

== Species ==
- Melophagus dyspnoetus Maa, 1980
- Melophagus grunini Maa & Doszhanov, 1980
- Melophagus himalayae Maa, 1969
- Melophagus kamtshaticus Doszhanov, 1979
- Melophagus kaukasikus Doszhanov, 2003
- Melophagus ovinus (Linnaeus, 1758)
- Melophagus pantholopsus Sun, 1996
- Melophagus rupicaprinus Rondani, 1879

== Distribution ==
They are native to Europe, Asia and North Africa. M. ovinus ovinus has been introduced to most parts of the world where domestic sheep are kept.

== Hosts ==
All are parasites of cloven-hoofed mammals - Family Bovidae, including domestic sheep, domestic cattle, the Mongolian gazelle (Procapra gutturosa), the chamois (Rupicapra rupicapra), the alpine ibex (Capra ibex), the yak (Bos grunniens), plus doubtful records on the argali (Ovis ammon), the bighorn sheep (Ovis canadensis) and the Dall sheep (Ovis dalli).

Females could only mate until 24 hours of emergence from the puparium, after which they stored sufficient sperms to fertilize the egg production.
