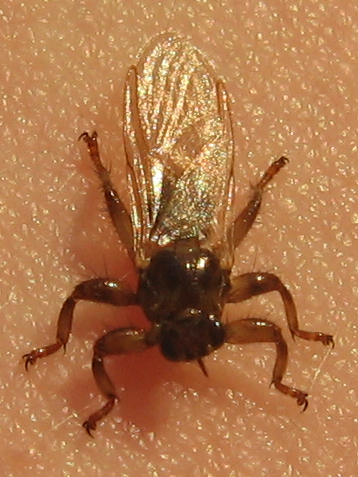
- Lipoptena cervi

Scientific classification
- Kingdom: Animalia
- Phylum: Arthropoda
- Class: Insecta
- Order: Diptera
- Family: Hippoboscidae
- Subfamily: Lipopteninae
- Genus: Lipoptena; Nitzsch, 1818

Type species
- Hippobosca cervina Nitzsch, 1818

Synonyms
- Alaphagus Walker, 1849; Alcephagus Gimmerthal, 1845; Echestypus Speiser, 1907; Haemobora Curtis, 1824; Leptoptenys Schiner, 1868; Leptotaena Blanchard, 1840; Leptotena Macquart, 1835; Lipoptenella Bequaert, 1942; Lipoptera Siebold, 1845; Lipotena Latreille, 1829; Lipotepna Latreille, 1829; Ornithobia Meigen, 1830

= Lipoptena =

Genus of flies

Lipoptena is a genus of flies in the family Hippoboscidae, known as louse flies or keds

== Systematics ==
- Species group 'a'

- Lipoptena axis Maa, 1969
- Lipoptena cervi (Linnaeus, 1758)
- Lipoptena efovea Speiser, 1905
- Lipoptena fortisetosa Maa, 1965
- Lipoptena japonica Bequaert, 1942
- Lipoptena nirvana Maa, 1969
- Lipoptena pauciseta Edwards, 1919
- Lipoptena rusaecola Bequaert, 1942
- Lipoptena saepes Maa, 1969
- Lipoptena sigma Maa, 1965
- Lipoptena timida Maa, 1969

- Species group 'b'

- Lipoptena pteropi Denny, 1843

- Species group 'c'

- Lipoptena arianae Maa, 1969
- Lipoptena capreoli Rondani, 1878
- Lipoptena chalcomleaena Speiser, 1904
- Lipoptena couturieri Séguy, 1935
- Lipoptena grahami Bequaert, 1942
- Lipoptena saltatrix Maa, 1969
- Lipoptena weidneri Maa, 1969

- Species group 'd'

- Lipoptena binoculus (Speiser, 1908)
- Lipoptena hopkinsi Bequaert, 1942
- Lipoptena iniqua Maa, 1969
- Lipoptena paradoxa Newstead, 1907
- Lipoptena sepiacea Speiser, 1905

- Species group 'e'

- Lipoptena depressa (Say, 1823)
- Lipoptena depressa pacifica Maa, 1969
- Lipoptena guimaraesi Bequaert, 1957
- Lipoptena mazamae Rondani, 1878

- Incertae sedis

- Lipoptena doszhanovi Grunin, 1974
- Lipoptena pudui Peterson & Maa, 1970
- Lipoptena sikae Mogi, 1975

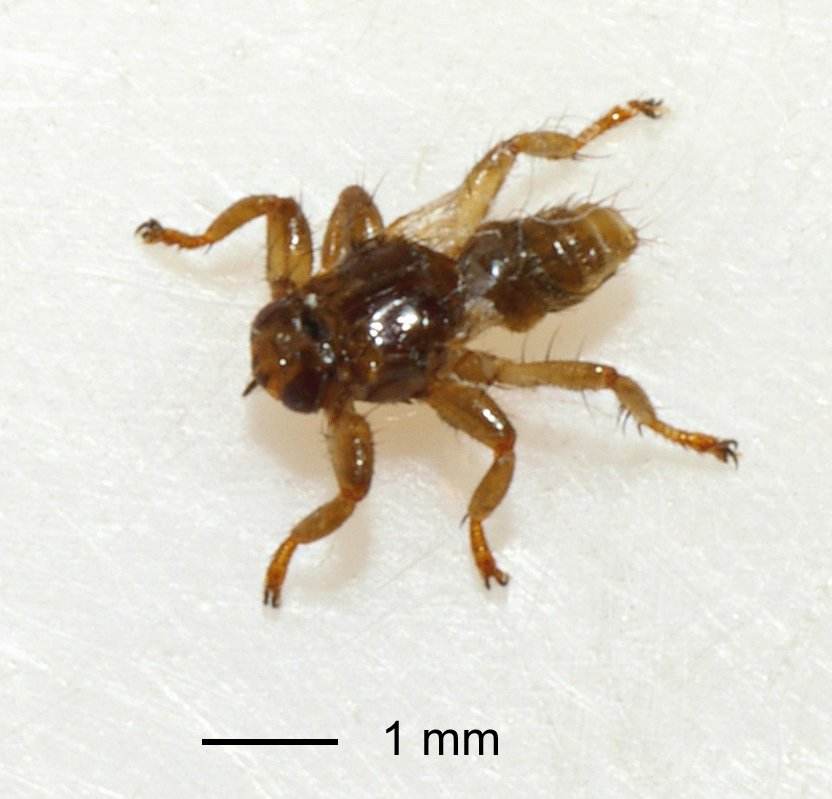
Lipoptena cervi
