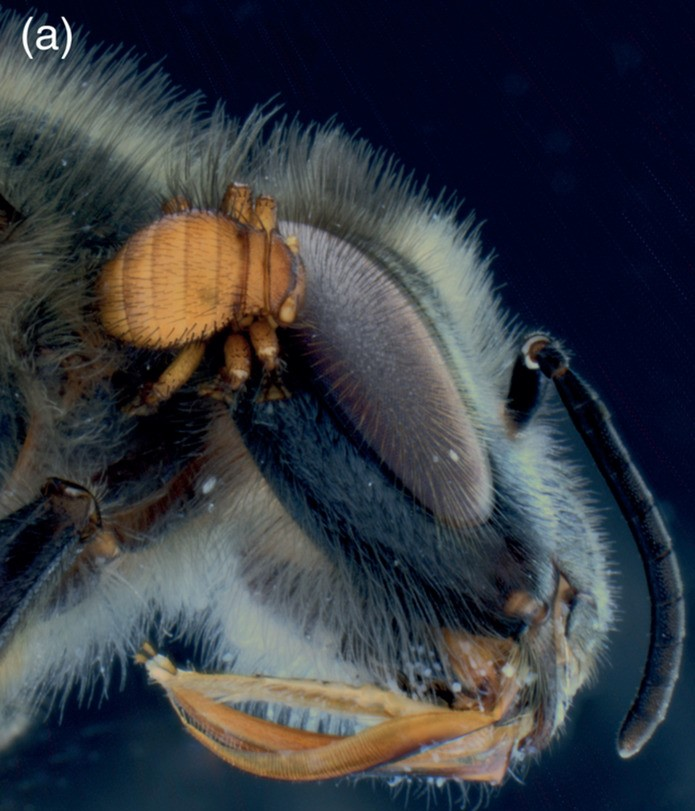
- Braula coeca on the head of an African honey bee

Scientific classification
- Kingdom: Animalia
- Phylum: Arthropoda
- Class: Insecta
- Order: Diptera
- Superfamily: Carnoidea
- Family: Braulidae; Egger, 1853

Genera
- Braula Nitzsch, 1818; Megabraula Grimaldi & Underwood, 1986

= Braulidae =

Family of flies

Braulidae, or bee lice, is a family of true flies (Diptera) with seven species in two genera, Braula and Megabraula. They are found in honey bee colonies due to their phoretic, inquiline, and kleptoparasitic relationships with the bees. Similar in appearance but not closely related to keds, these flies are also small, wingless, and occasionally mistaken for mites or lice, hence their common name.

== History ==
The first discovery of Braulidae was of Braula coeca, in 1818 by Christian Ludwig Nitzch, a German zoologist. In 1986, the genus Megabraula was discovered by David Grimaldi, an American entomologist. Braulidae are found throughout the world in Africa, Europe, Australia, North America, and South America. Since they prefer queen bees as hosts, they are thought to have been brought to the United States by queen importation. Many species of Braulidae are thought to have different host honey bee races. Some of these include B. Kohli and B.pretoriensis which are restricted to Carniolan and middle eastern honey bee races and B.schmitzi with the Italian race. B. coeca is the most widely known Braulidae species, most commonly seen on honey bees around the world.

== Life cycle ==
=== Adults ===
The adult Braulidae life-cycle is intimately connected with that of honey bees. The adults roam around on adult honey bees, feeding on their mouth secretions. Although they do not harm the bees, they may be a major nuisance to them in certain areas. As adults, they will eat honey and when available, preferring royal jelly. The adults are nimble and scramble for food being fed to the queen. When present, Braulidae are most likely found in bee hives, and at times on flowers waiting for bees to hang onto. Once the adults become mature, their eggs are laid on honey bee wax cappings.

Size of Braulidae may vary. Braula will be about 1.6mm and the Megabraula will be about 3mm. They have reduced eyes located just above the antennae, their antennae are hidden in grooves, and their legs are short and robust. Unlike most flies, they lack wings or halteres. They are reddish-brown in color, have a 5-segmented tarsus, and their thorax is only half as long as their head. They also lack a distinct scutellum on the metathorax.

=== Larvae / immatures ===
The larvae of Braulidae are maggot-like with a flattened posterior end and pointed anterior end. They tunnel through wax and comb feeding on the wax and pollen. Because they are in the suborder Schizophora, they emerge from the puparium through the use of the ptilinum, an eversible sack on the front of the head that inflates to burst a circular exit from the end of the puparium.

== Behavior ==
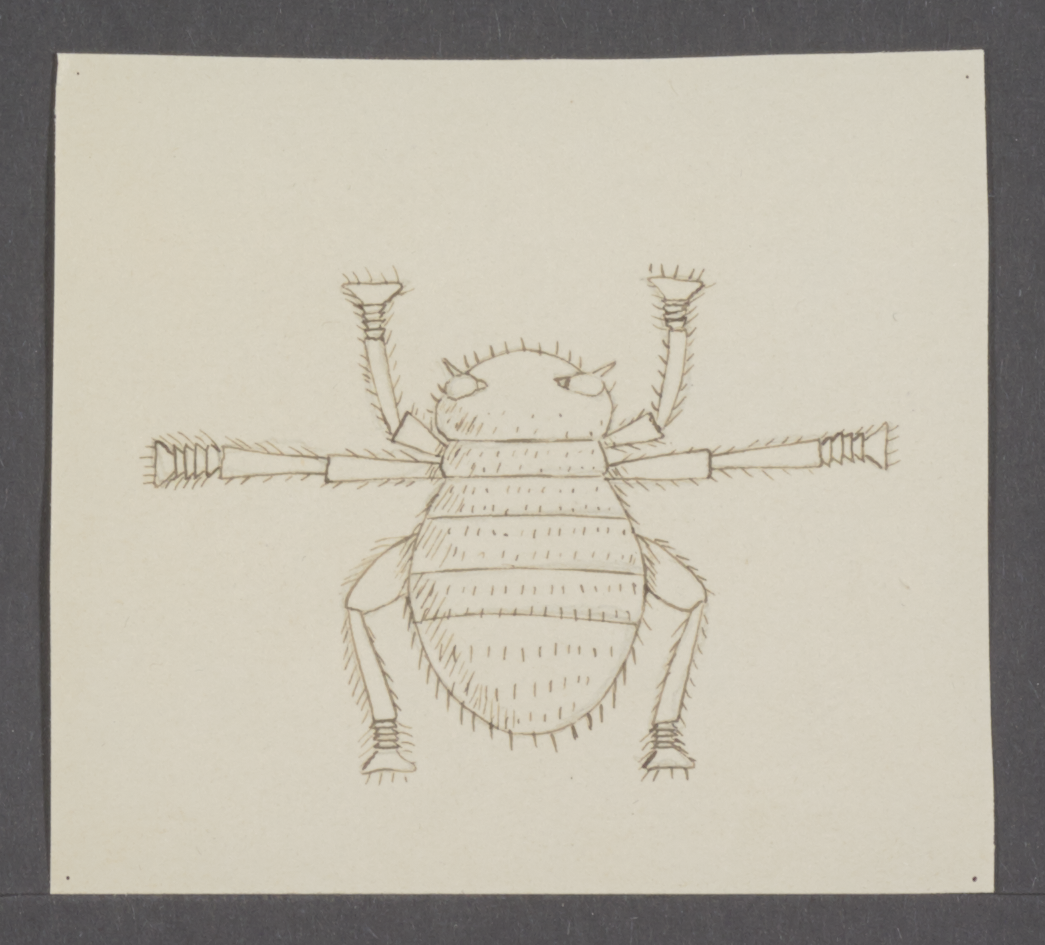
Drawing of a braula

Although Braulidae may be seen on adult honey bees, they are most commonly seen on queen bees. Several (up to 30 reported) can be found on a queen bee at one time, whereas there may only be one or two at most on worker honey bees.

== Phylogeny ==
Since its discovery, the phylogenetic placement of Braulidae has been uncertain. Up until the 20th century, because of its unique characteristics, scientists were unaware of its placement. Since very little is known about Braulidae, the species Braula coeca has been the most studied.

- 1818 Nitzsch thought it was pupiparous (young that have already reached the pupal state upon hatching).
- 1858 Leukart thought they were oviparous (young hatching from an egg), instead of ovoviviparous (eggs hatching within the mother's body, then emerging as live young).
- 1900s they were thought to have been with Phoridae.
- 1917 Hermann Schmitz noted a well-developed ptilinal fissure, making it an acalyptrate cyclorrhaphan (Schizophora)
- 1972 Willi Hennig, after much speculation, agreed with Schmitz and placed the Braulidae near the family Sphaeroceridae (Muscoidea & Anthomyzoinea)
- 1982 Hackman & Vaisanen did not include Braulidae within their fly classification.
- 2011 Wiegmann, et al. placed Braulidae within superfamily Ephydroidea, as the sister group to Drosophilidae.
