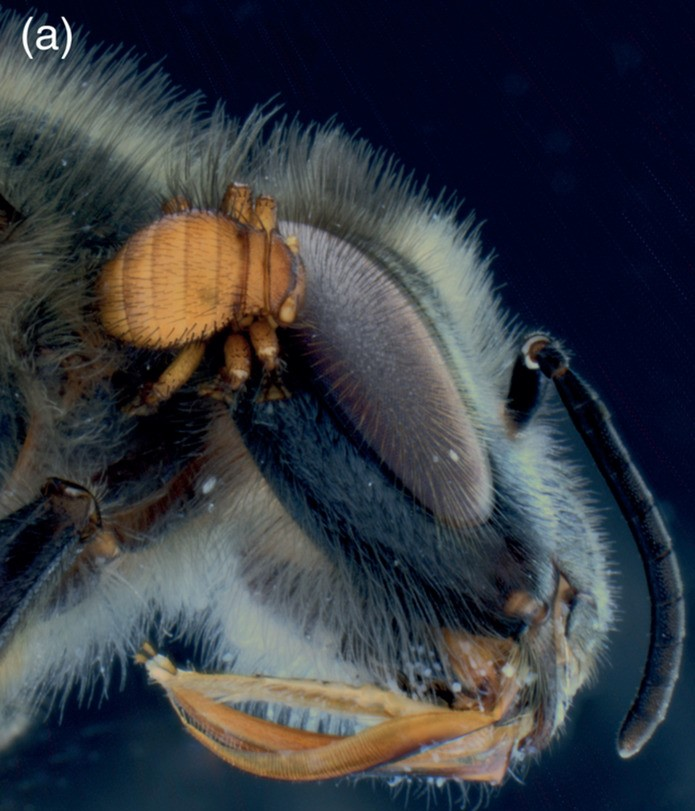
- Braula coeca attached to the head of its host, Apis mellifera scutellata.

Scientific classification
- Kingdom: Animalia
- Phylum: Arthropoda
- Class: Insecta
- Order: Diptera
- Family: Braulidae
- Genus: Braula
- Species: B. coeca

Binomial name
- Braula coeca Nitzsch, 1818

Synonyms
- Acarus gymnopterorum Linnaeus, 1758; Braula hansruttneri Huttinger, 1980; Entomibia apum Costa, 1846

= Braula coeca =

Species of fly

Braula coeca, the bee louse, is a species of bee louse in the family Braulidae.
