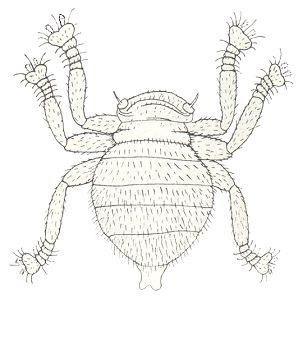
- Braula coeca

Scientific classification
- Kingdom: Animalia
- Phylum: Arthropoda
- Class: Insecta
- Order: Diptera
- Superfamily: Carnoidea
- Family: Braulidae
- Genus: Braula; Nitzsch, 1818

Type species
- Braula coeca Nitzsch, 1818

Synonyms
- Entomibia Costa, 1846; Entomybia Rondani, 1879; Melitomyia Bigot, 1885; Melittomyia Bezzi, 1905

= Braula =

Genus of flies

Braula is a genus of flies (Diptera) in the family Braulidae. These are very unusual flies, wingless and flattened, and barely recognizable as Diptera. Braula coeca Nitzsch is a pest of honey bees. The larvae tunnel through the wax honeycomb and the adults are found on the bodies of honey bees. There is some debate whether the bee louse causes damage to the honey bee. These flies sometimes can be found at places where bees congregate such as flowers or salt licks, waiting to grab onto hosts from uninfested nests. Braula is cosmopolitan and about 1.6 mm in length.

== Species ==
- Braula coeca Nitzsch, 1818
- Braula kohli Schmitz, 1914
- Braula orientalis Òròsi Pál, 1963
- Braula pretoriensis Òròsi Pál, 1939
- Braula schmitzi Òròsi Pál, 1939
