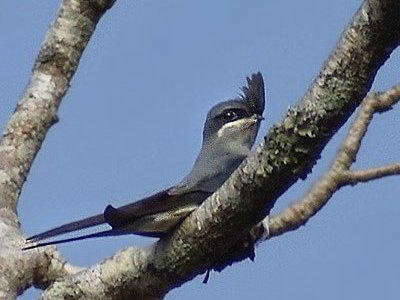
- Crested treeswift (H. coronata)

Scientific classification
- Kingdom: Animalia
- Phylum: Chordata
- Class: Aves
- Order: Apodiformes
- Family: Hemiprocnidae; Oberholser, 1906
- Genus: Hemiprocne; Nitzsch, 1829

Species
- 4; see text

= Treeswift =

Treeswifts

Family of birds

Treeswifts, or crested swifts, are a family, the Hemiprocnidae, of aerial birds, closely related to the true swifts. The family contains a single genus, Hemiprocne, with four species. They are distributed from India and Southeast Asia through Indonesia to New Guinea and the Solomon Islands.

== Description ==
Treeswifts are small to medium-sized swifts, ranging in length from 15 to 30 cm. They have long wings, with most of the length coming from the length of the primaries; their arms are actually quite short. They visibly differ from the other swifts in matters of plumage, which is softer, and they have crests or other facial ornaments, and long, forked tails. Anatomically they are separated from the true swifts by skeletal details in the cranium and palate, the anatomy of the tarsus, and a nonreversible hind toe that is used for perching on branches (an activity in which true swifts are unable to engage). The males have iridescent mantle plumage. They also have diastataxic wings, that is they lack a fifth secondary feather unlike swifts in the Apodini, which are eutaxic.

== Ecology ==
The treeswifts exhibit a wide range of habitat preferences. One species, the whiskered treeswift, is a species belonging to primary forest. Highly manoeuvrable, it feeds close to vegetation beneath the canopy, and only rarely ventures into secondary forests or plantations, but never over open ground. Other species are less restricted; the crested treeswift makes use of a range of habitats including humid forests and deciduous woodland, and the grey-rumped treeswift occupies almost every habitat type available from the mangrove forests to hill forests. All species feed on insects, although exact details of what prey are taken has not been studied in detail.

Nest-building responsibilities are shared by the male and female. They lay one egg in the nest, which is glued to an open tree branch. Egg colour varies from white to grey. Little information is available about incubation times, but they are thought to be longer for the larger species. Chicks hatch with a covering of grey down and are fed a bolus of regurgitated food by the parents.

== Species ==
Genus Hemiprocne – Nitzsch, 1829 – four species
Common name	Scientific name and subspecies	Range	Size and ecology	IUCN status and estimated population
Crested treeswift	Hemiprocne coronata (Tickel, 1833)	India, Sri Lanka, Bhutan, Bangladesh, Nepal, Myanmar, Thailand, Vietnam, Cambodia, Laos and China	Size: Habitat: Diet:	LC
Grey-rumped treeswift	Hemiprocne longipennis (Rafinesque, 1802)	Brunei, Indonesia, Malaysia, Myanmar, the Philippines, Singapore, and Thailand.	Size: Habitat: Diet:	LC
Whiskered treeswift	Hemiprocne comata (Temminck, 1824)	Brunei, Indonesia, Malaysia, Myanmar, the Philippines, Singapore, and Thailand.	Size: Habitat: Diet:	LC
Moustached treeswift	Hemiprocne mystacea (Lesson & Garnot, 1827)	northern Moluccas, New Guinea, Bismarck and the Solomon Islands archipelagos.	Size: Habitat: Diet:	LC
