= Neolipoptena =

Scientific classification
- Kingdom: Animalia
- Phylum: Arthropoda
- Class: Insecta
- Order: Diptera
- Family: Hippoboscidae
- Subfamily: Lipopteninae
- Genus: Neolipoptena; Bequaert, 1942

Type species
- Lipoptena ferrisi Bequaert, 1935

Genus of flies

Neolipoptena is a genus of flies in the family Hippoboscidae.

== Species ==
- Neolipoptena ferrisi (Bequaert, 1935)
