= Ked itch =

- Specialty: Dermatology

Ked itch is a cutaneous condition caused by sheep ked (Melophagus ovinus) which feed by thrusting their sharp mouth parts into the skin and sucking blood.

== See also ==
- Skin lesion
