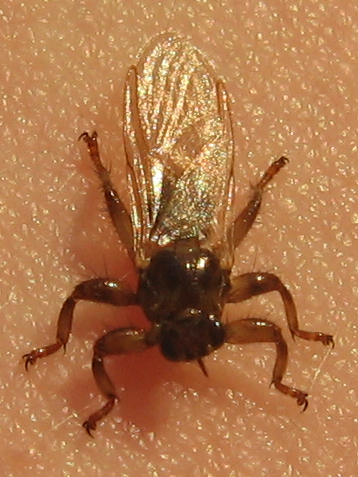
- Lipoptena cervi, with wings

Scientific classification
- Kingdom: Animalia
- Phylum: Arthropoda
- Class: Insecta
- Order: Diptera
- Family: Hippoboscidae
- Subfamily: Lipopteninae
- Genus: Lipoptena
- Species: L. cervi

Binomial name
- Lipoptena cervi (Linnaeus, 1758)

Synonyms
- Haemobora pallipes Curtis, 1824; Hippobosca cervi Olivier, 1792; Hippobosca cervina Nitzsch, 1818; Hippobosca moschi Pallas, 1779; Lipoptena alcis Schnabl, 1881; Lipoptena subulata Coquillett, 1907; Melophaga moschi Wiedemann, 1830; Melophagus trifasciata von Olfers, 1816; Ornithobia pallida Meigen, 1830; Ornithomyia nigrirostris Roser, 1840; Pediculus capreoli von Olfers, 1816; Pediculus cervi Linnaeus, 1758

= Lipoptena cervi =

Species of fly

Lipoptena cervi, the deer ked or deer fly, is a species of biting fly in the family of louse flies, Hippoboscidae. These flies are commonly encountered in temperate areas of Europe, Siberia, and northern China. They have been introduced to North America. They are parasites of elk, deer, and other deer family members, burrowing through the fur and sucking the blood of the host animals. Adults are only 5–7 mm (0.20–0.28 in) in length and brownish in colour. Their bodies are flat and elastic, making their removal difficult. L. cervi is a poor flier and can only fly for short distances. Once the insect reaches its target, it sheds its wings and starts burrowing through the fur.

== Bite ==
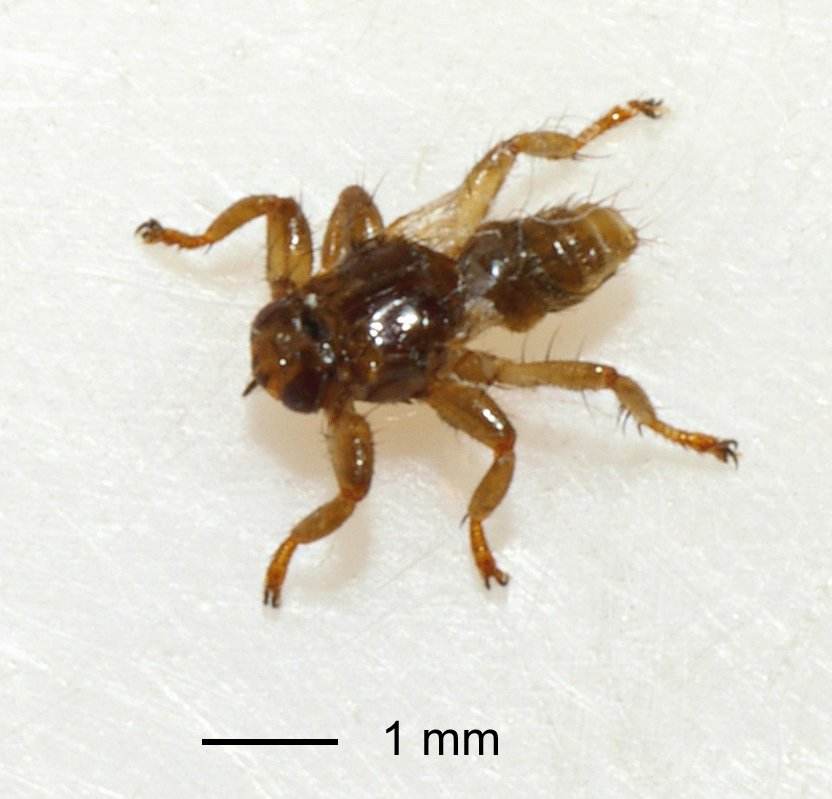
Lipoptena cervi without wings.

Although their life cycle depends on deer, they may on rare occasions bite humans, producing responses ranging from unnoticeable to highly allergic. Initially, the bite may be barely noticeable and leaves little or no trace. Within 3 days, the site may develop into a hard, reddened welt. The accompanying itch is intense and typically lasts 14 to 20 days. Occasionally, an itch papule may persist for up to a year. The main annoyance in humans is the inconvenience and unpleasantness of removing keds from hair and clothes.

Anaplasma phagocytophilum, a Gram-negative, obligately intracellular bacterium that causes anaplasmosis, has been detected in L. cervi, as has Borrelia burgdorferi, the causative agent of Lyme disease, but whether the insect can serve as a vector is as yet unknown.

Horses can develop colic after a bite. Dogs that are bitten may develop a moderate to severe dermatitis. And L. cervi can attain Bartonella schoenbuchensis from biting deer. Much, however, remains unknown about the ked's potential to pose a medical or veterinary threat.

Remains of L. cervi have been found on Ötzi, the Stone Age mummy from the Schnalstal glacier in South Tyrol.

== Life history ==
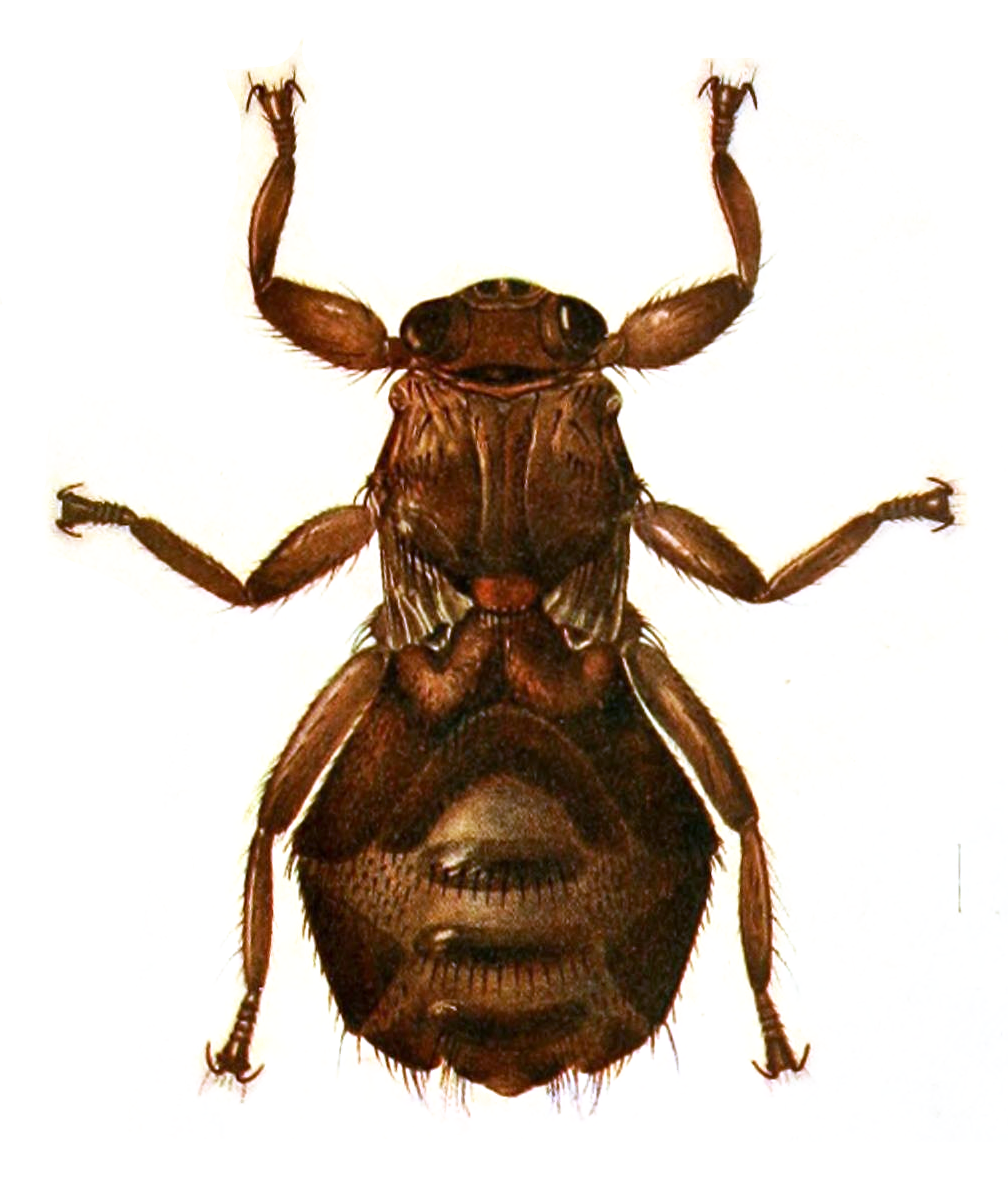
Female

Both males and females of L. cervi consume blood from their hosts. Feeding lasts 15 to 25 minutes. The female produces one larva at a time and retains the developing larva in her body until it is ready to pupate. The larva feeds on the secretions of a "milk gland" in the uterus of its mother. The female gives birth to a fully mature white prepupa. She may produce larvae for as long as 10 months. A newborn prepupa immediately darkens, forms the puparium, and begins to pupate on the forest floor, or where the deer are bedded. After pupation, the winged adult emerges and flies in search of a host. Upon finding a host, the adult fly breaks off its wings and it is permanently associated with its host.

== Distribution ==
This species is found in most of Europe (including Great Britain and Ireland), as well as Algeria, eastern Siberia, and northern China. It was introduced to and is established in the Eastern United States (New Hampshire, Massachusetts, Pennsylvania, Idaho, and New York). It also spread to Finland from Russia in the early 1960s, where it primarily feeds on moose, though it is spreading to reindeer.

== Hosts ==
Red deer, elk (moose), roe deer, fallow deer, and Siberian musk deer are this fly's native hosts. In the United States, it has acquired hosts such as Canadian deer, white-tailed deer, and reindeer. There are stray records of bites on humans, dogs and badger, and it will occasionally commit to the wrong host.

== See also ==
- Deer fly

== Notes ==
11. Egri, B., Rigó, E.(2014): A Hanság gímszarvasainak Lipoptena cervi (Linnaeus, 1758) fertőzöttségéről (Irodalmi összefoglaló és saját megfigyelések)(About the deer ked ((Lipoptena cervi, 1758))infestation on the red deer in Hanság Region. Literature review and own examinations. Magyar Állatorvosok Lapja, 136.2.: 115–122.
