= Lipoptena pteropi =

Scientific classification
- Kingdom: Animalia
- Phylum: Arthropoda
- Class: Insecta
- Order: Diptera
- Family: Hippoboscidae
- Subfamily: Lipopteninae
- Genus: Lipoptena
- Species: L. pteropi

Binomial name
- Lipoptena pteropi Denny, 1843

Synonyms
- Lipoptena gracilis Speiser, 1903; Lipoptena traguli Ferris & Cole, 1922

Species of fly

Lipoptena pteropi is a species of fly in the family Hippoboscidae.

== Distribution ==
Java, Malaysia, Mergui Archipelago, Thailand, Vietnam.
