= Lipoptena paradoxa =

Scientific classification
- Kingdom: Animalia
- Phylum: Arthropoda
- Class: Insecta
- Order: Diptera
- Family: Hippoboscidae
- Subfamily: Lipopteninae
- Genus: Lipoptena
- Species: L. paradoxa

Binomial name
- Lipoptena paradoxa Newstead, Dutton & Todd, 1907

Synonyms
- Echestypus parvipalpis Speiser, 1907

Species of fly

Lipoptena paradoxa is a species of fly in the family Hippoboscidae.

== Distribution ==
Congo.
