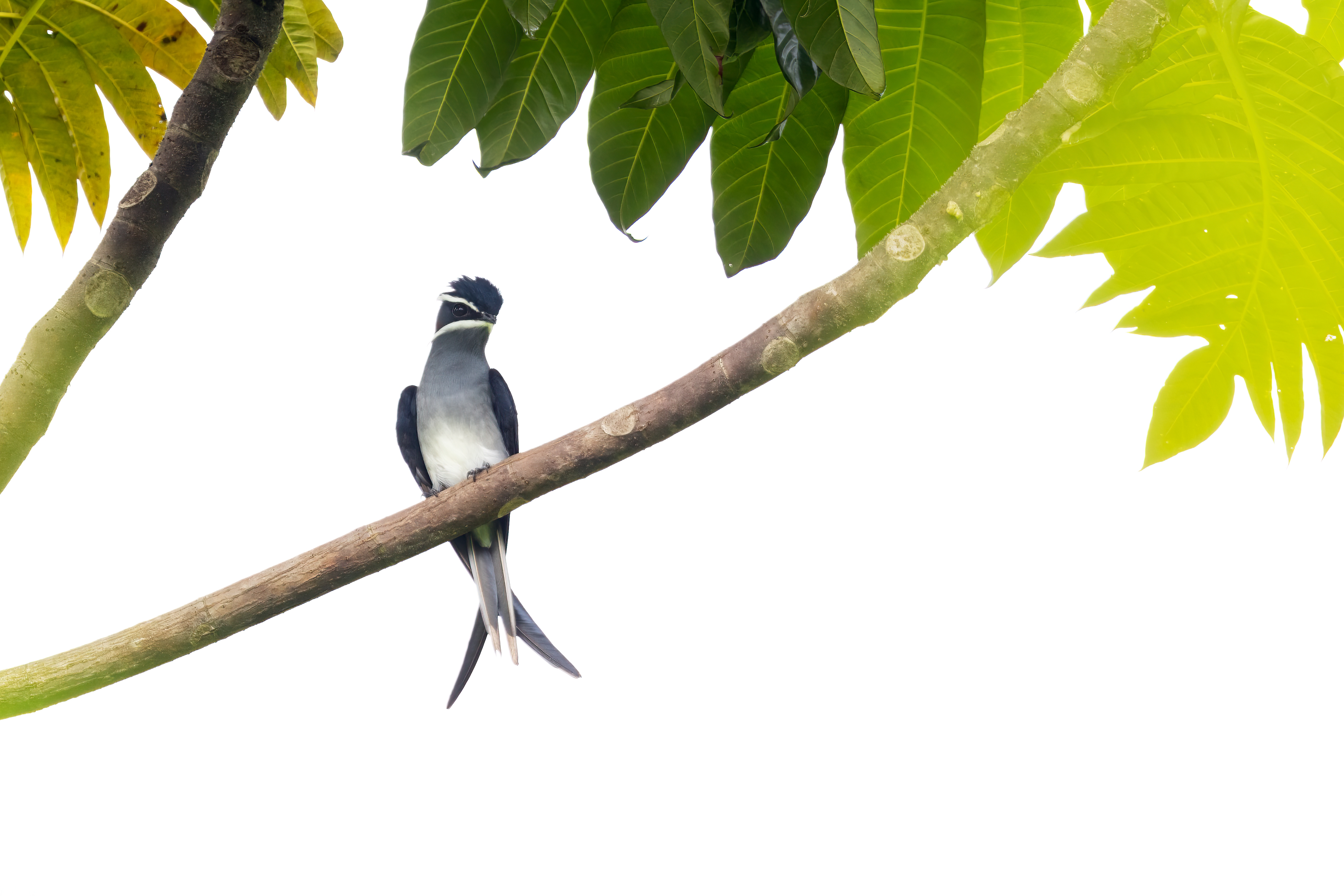

Conservation status
- Least Concern (IUCN 3.1)

Scientific classification
- Kingdom: Animalia
- Phylum: Chordata
- Class: Aves
- Order: Apodiformes
- Family: Hemiprocnidae
- Genus: Hemiprocne
- Species: H. mystacea

Binomial name
- Hemiprocne mystacea (Lesson & Garnot, 1827)

= Moustached treeswift =

Species of bird

The moustached treeswift (Hemiprocne mystacea) is a species of bird in the family Hemiprocnidae. It is found in the northern Moluccas, New Guinea, Bismarck and the Solomon Islands archipelagos. Its natural habitats are subtropical or tropical moist lowland forests, subtropical or tropical mangrove forests, and subtropical or tropical moist montane forests.

The moustached treeswift is known for its remarkable aerial foraging abilities. Recent scientific studies, such as Rohwer and Wang's quantitative analysis in 2010, have highlighted the unique feather replacement patterns that contribute to its agile flight and successful prey capture.
