= Trypanosoma melophagium =

Scientific classification
- Domain: Eukaryota
- Supergroup: Discoba
- Phylum: Euglenozoa
- Class: Kinetoplastea
- Order: Trypanosomatida
- Family: Trypanosomatidae
- Genus: Trypanosoma
- Subgenus: Megatrypanum
- Species: T. melophagium

Binomial name
- Trypanosoma melophagium Flu, 1908

Species of Kinetoplastea

Trypanosoma melophagium is a protozoan species found within the unicellular parasitic genus Trypanosoma, class Kinetoplastea, and overall phylum Euglenozoa.

== Morphology ==
Generally the morphology of Trypanosoma protozoans possess an elongated slender body shape containing a nucleus, nucleolus, undulating membrane, attached flagellum, free flagellum, pellide, ectoplasm, endoplasm, reserve food granules, blepharoplast of basal granule, and a kinetoplast. Some distinguishing characteristics of the T. melophagium species is the placement of the kinetoplast being closer to the nucleus rather than to the posterior end and a pointed tail. This helps to differentiate T. melophagium from other Trypanosoma species such as T. cruzi, T. lewisi, T. rangeli and more. All of which follow the same life cycle as T. melophagium known as stercorarian trypanosomes.

== Life cycle ==
This specific life cycle is used with Trypanosoma protozoans which are transferred to their mammalian host through the feces of an infected fly therefore splitting the parasites life cycle in two. The first part being the "developmental stage" where the asexual reproduction of the parasite occurs in the flies hind-gut and the second part is when the transmission of the fly infects the mammalian host via feces. In the case of T. melophagium the derived host or vector is the Melophagus ovinus fly also known as "sheep ked" and the mammalian hosts for these parasites are mainly sheep and lambs.

Furthermore, given that information the step-by-step life cycle of T. melophagium would consist of the following: 1. Sheep ked becomes infected with T. melophagium from an infected blood meal filled with trypomastigotes from a mammalian (sheep/lamb) 2. T. melophagium parasites travel to the hind intestinal tract of the fly where they replicate turning trypomastigotes into epimastigotes 3. These epimastigotes then attach to the rectum and become trypomastigotes and exit the fly via feces 4. Mammalian host become infected when the feces filled with trypomastigotes enter the mammal's body via mucus membranes or wound 5. Once in the host the trypomastigotes circulate through blood stream and reach other bodily fluids transforming into amastigotes 6. The amastigotes then begin to reproduce asexually through binary fission 7. amastigotes turn into trypomastigotes, and the cycle continues.

== Symptoms and treatments ==
Now that there is a better understanding within the life cycle of Trypanosoma melophagium the symptoms and treatment will come more easily. Although T. melophagium is a nonpathogenic parasite the sheep ked that feeds on the mammal's blood could cause the mammal to become anemic and or lose weight in severe cases. The bite from the fly could also cause skin irritation leading the mammal to rub itself causing wool or fur to become patchy, and the feces from the fly will cause discoloration to the fur or wool.

So, in order to stop the spread of T. melophagium there would have to be a removal of the sheep ked. To remove the sheep ked from the mammals they must be treated by either shearing the wool/fur or using treatment dips that have ivermectin or pyrethrin in them to kill the adult keds. While the dip treatments will get rid of adult keds they will not get rid of the eggs so these treatments must be done continuously. Along with shearing the wool/fur and or using treatment dips it is advised to use insecticides to decrease the population of the sheep keds altogether. Decreasing the population of sheep keds will further stop the spread of T. melophagium because if there is no vector to transmit the protozoan parasite then it cannot get to the mammalian host to infect it.
