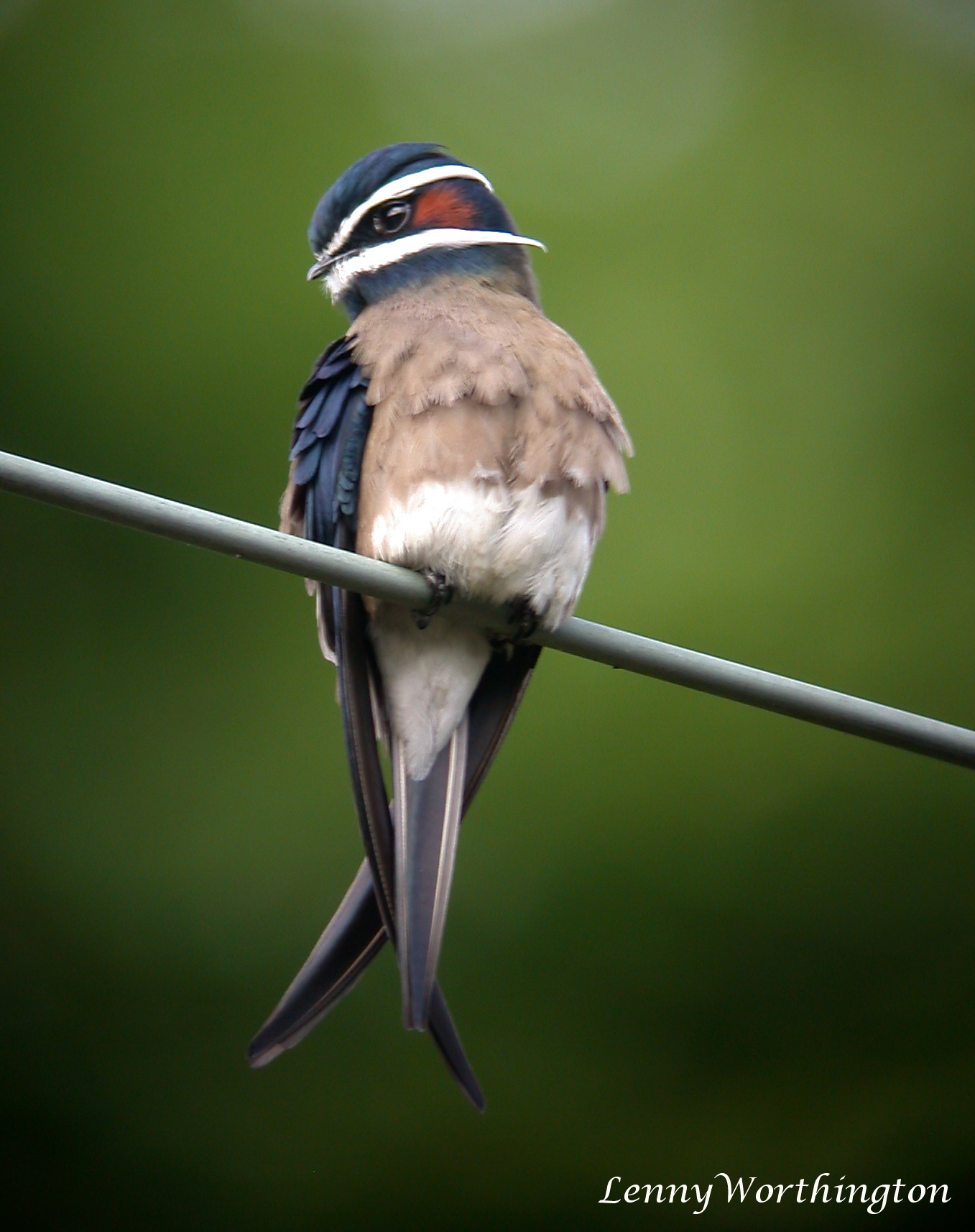
- Male, Luzon
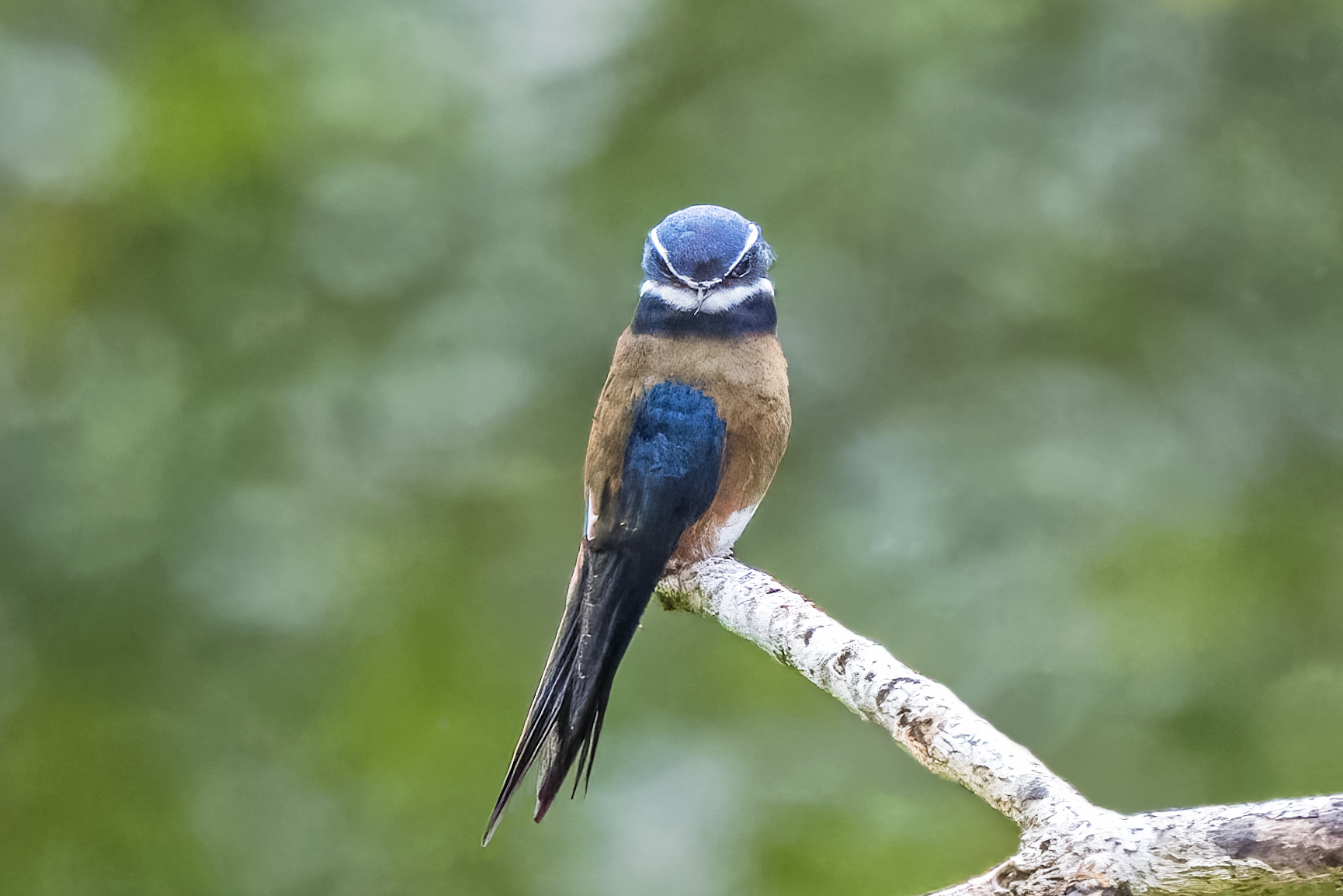
- Female, Bohol both H. c. major

Conservation status
- Least Concern (IUCN 3.1)

Scientific classification
- Kingdom: Animalia
- Phylum: Chordata
- Class: Aves
- Order: Apodiformes
- Family: Hemiprocnidae
- Genus: Hemiprocne
- Species: H. comata

Binomial name
- Hemiprocne comata (Temminck, 1824)

= Whiskered treeswift =

Species of bird

The whiskered treeswift (Hemiprocne comata) is a species of bird in the family Hemiprocnidae. It is the smallest of 4 species in genus Hemiprocne and is found in Brunei, Indonesia, Malaysia, Myanmar, the Philippines, Singapore, and Thailand.

Its natural habitats are subtropical or tropical moist lowland forest, subtropical or tropical mangrove forest, and subtropical or tropical moist montane forest.

== Description ==
Medium, unique white elongated 'whiskers' above and below eye, shaggy crest, deeply forked tail, sexes similar. Male lores black; two elongated white 'whiskers', one above eye from forehead extending past nape; ear chestnut; rest of head and throat, tail, upper and underwing coverts, and primaries dark metallic blue. Each secondary has a large white spot on inner web; back to uppertail coverts, breast and upper belly bronze olive; lower belly and undertail coverts white. Female lacks chestnut ear. Immature plumage not known. Bill black; eye dark brown; legs purplish brown.

== Nesting ==
Whiskered treeswifts are usually 14-16cm long with 13cm wings. Due to their small size, their nesting habitats have been observed to be composed of small feathers. These feathers are shaped in a cup like form with the use of mucin (saliva). The whiskered treeswifts utilize feathers from different birds as well, for example, they have been spotted adding the feather of a pigeon to their nests in a study. Their nests are usually the size suitable for only one pure egg. Whiskered treeswifts have been known for forming their nests on twigs at the top of high trees. They tend to create their nest several meters above forest crowns.

Both male and female birds take turns incubating the egg in their nest, though, the female treeswift tends to fulfill the majority of the incubation. The treeswift which is not incubating usually remains perched near the nest, prepared for switching roles or protecting the egg when foragers are nearby. The parent treeswifts will also utilize their non-incubation period to hunt for insects.

After the egg completes its incubation period in the nest and it hatches, the hatchling is described to be blind and naked, with grey-toned skin. The nest is where the female treeswift returns to regurgitate any food she found into the upward facing head of her hatchling. The incubation is thought to be between 14-20 days long. After the hatching period, the remnants of the egg is removed from the small nest. After two weeks of life in the nest, the nestling is typically left apart from the parent treeswifts for longer as they are found brooding (or resting) higher up in the designated nesting tree. As the fledgling continues to grow, it will eventually outsize its nest. At 28 days of age, the nestling closely resembles its parents, though it still relies on the adult treeswifts to forage for food. After a period of 8 weeks, the hatchling is relatively independent, though it remains close to the parental territory. Within an additional week, the hatchling has usually parted from the parental territory, leaving only the parent whiskered treeswifts and the nest, which remains attached to the twig above the forest crowns for a multitude of weeks, even after its departure.
