= Megabraula =

Scientific classification
- Kingdom: Animalia
- Phylum: Arthropoda
- Class: Insecta
- Order: Diptera
- Superfamily: Carnoidea
- Family: Braulidae
- Genus: Megabraula; Grimaldi & Underwood, 1986

Type species
- Megabraula onerosa Grimaldi & Underwood, 1986

Genus of flies

Megabraula is a fly genus in the family Braulidae. These are very unusual flies, wingless and flattened, and barely recognizable as Diptera. Megabraula is found in Nepal and is 3 mm in length. Both species are found in the nests of Apis laboriosa

== Species ==
- Megabraula antecessor Grimaldi & Underwood, 1986
- Megabraula onerosa Grimaldi & Underwood, 1986
