= Neolipoptena ferrisi =

Scientific classification
- Kingdom: Animalia
- Phylum: Arthropoda
- Clade: Pancrustacea
- Class: Insecta
- Order: Diptera
- Family: Hippoboscidae
- Subfamily: Lipopteninae
- Genus: Neolipoptena
- Species: N. ferrisi

Binomial name
- Neolipoptena ferrisi (Bequaert, 1935)

Synonyms
- Lipoptena ferrisi Bequaert, 1935

Species of fly

Neolipoptena ferrisi, or the Pacific deer ked, is a species of fly from the family Hippoboscidae. They are blood-feeding parasites of the mule deer - Odocoileus hemionus, the white-tailed deer - Odocoileus virginianus & The Pronghorn - Antilocapra americana. They are found from British Columbia, Canada, to Baja California, Mexico. and Australia.

They are often misidentified as ticks.

The female fly will produce a single larvae at a time, retaining the larva internally until it is ready to pupate. The larva feeds on the secretions of a milk gland in the uterus of the female. After three larval instars, a white pre-pupa which immediately forms a hard dark puparium. The pupa is usually deposited where the deer slept overnight. When the pupa has completed its pupation. a winged adult emerges and flies in search of a suitable host, upon which fly sheds its wings and is permanently associated with the same host. This is typical of most members of the family Hippoboscidae.
