= Lipoptena capreoli =

Scientific classification
- Kingdom: Animalia
- Phylum: Arthropoda
- Class: Insecta
- Order: Diptera
- Family: Hippoboscidae
- Genus: Lipoptena
- Species: L. capreoli

Binomial name
- Lipoptena capreoli Rondani, 1878

Synonyms
- Lipoptena caprina Austen, 1921

Species of fly

Lipoptena capreoli is a species of fly in the family Hippoboscidae. It is found in India, Pakistan, southern Europe, and western Asia.
