= Lipoptena grahami =

Scientific classification
- Kingdom: Animalia
- Phylum: Arthropoda
- Class: Insecta
- Order: Diptera
- Family: Hippoboscidae
- Genus: Lipoptena
- Species: L. grahami

Binomial name
- Lipoptena grahami Bequaert, 1942

Species of fly

Lipoptena grahami is a species of fly in the family Hippoboscidae. It is found in China.
