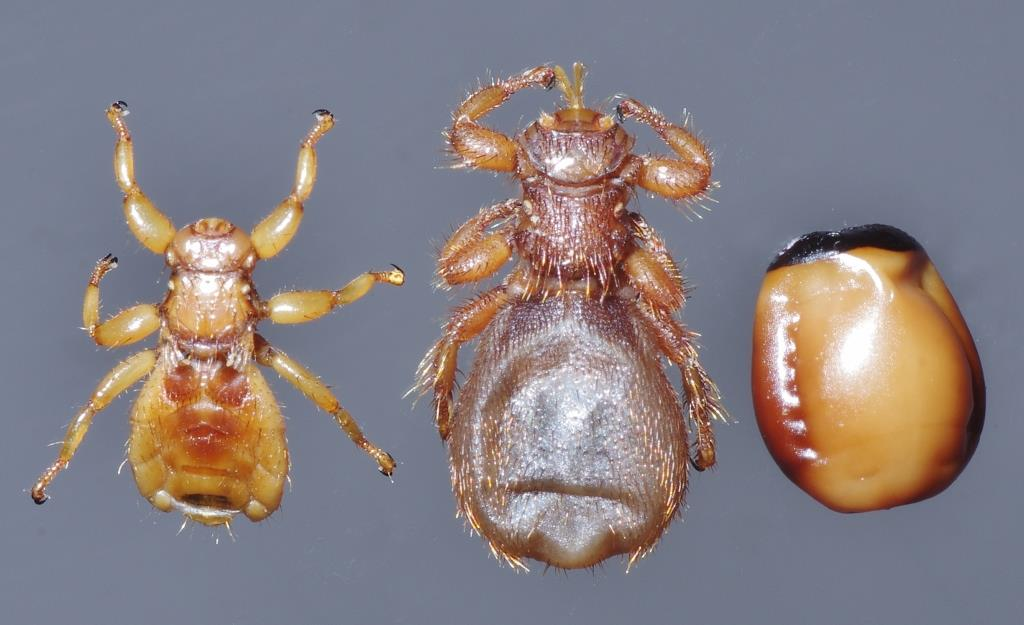
- Male, female and puparium

Scientific classification
- Kingdom: Animalia
- Phylum: Arthropoda
- Clade: Pancrustacea
- Class: Insecta
- Order: Diptera
- Family: Hippoboscidae
- Genus: Melophagus
- Species: M. ovinus

Binomial name
- Melophagus ovinus (Linnaeus, 1758)

Subspecies
- M. ovinus ovinus (Linnaeus, 1758); M. ovinus himalayae Maa, 1969

Synonyms
- Hippobosca ovina Linnaeus, 1758; Melophagus montanus Ferris & Cole, 1922

= Melophagus ovinus =

Species of fly

Melophagus ovinus, or the sheep ked, is a brown, hairy wingless fly that resembles a tick. This wingless insect is about 4 to 6 mm long and has a small head; it is a fly from the family Hippoboscidae. They are blood-feeding parasites of sheep. The sheep ked feeds on the blood of its host by inserting its sharp mouthparts into capillaries beneath the skin. The legs of the sheep ked are very strong and tipped with claws. Sheep keds live their whole lives in the wool of sheep. They are most commonly found on the neck, shoulders, and underbelly of the host animal. Although they are often referred to as the "sheep tick", sheep keds spend their entire lifecycle on their hosts, which is distinguishable from the characteristics of a true tick. Additionally, sheep keds have six legs, whereas true ticks have eight legs.

== Distribution ==
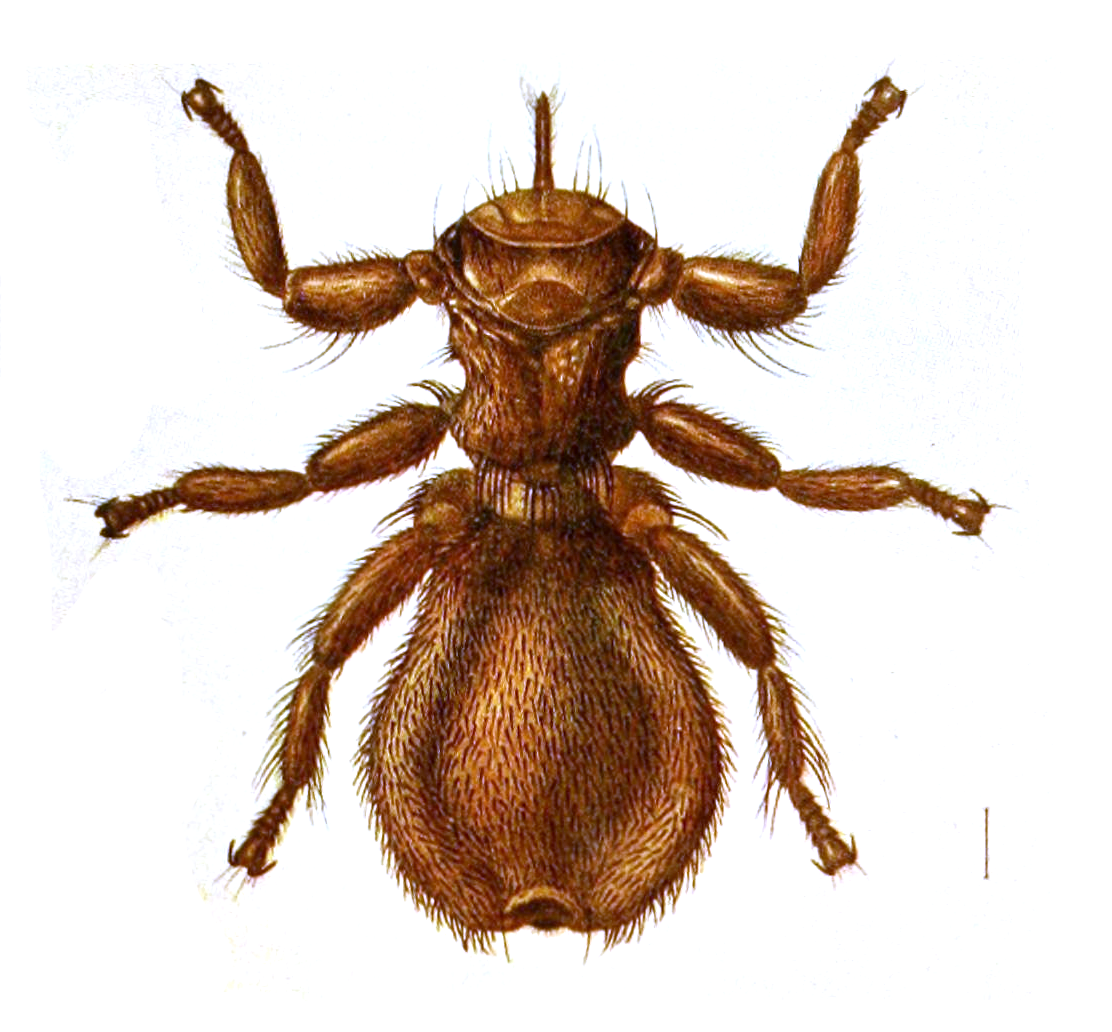
Female

Native to most of Europe including Iceland, and the Faroe Islands, as well as North West Africa, Mongolia, and North India, it was introduced and established in Kenya, South Africa, Japan, Australia, New Zealand, most of North America, and many parts of South America, including Tristan da Cunha and the Falkland Islands.

== Hosts ==
The primary host of M. ovinus is the domestic sheep. Also, records on argali (Ovis ammon), bighorn sheep (Ovis canadensis), and Dall sheep (Ovis dalli) are doubted.

== Lifecycle ==
Sheep keds live for typically four to six months, and may produce from 10 to 20 larvae. The female fly produces a single larva at a time, retaining the larva internally until it is ready to pupate. The larva feeds on the secretions of a "milk" gland in the uterus of the female. After three larval instars, the white prepupa immediately forms a hard, dark puparium. This is deposited on the wool of the sheep and is attached with a glue-like material. The larva immediately hardens and becomes a darker color. This pupal stage lasts for 19 to 23 days in the summer and 20 to 36 days in the winter. Pupal stages are not susceptible to insecticides. If removed from the host, the adult lives for 7–10 days.

Symbiotic enterobacterium Candidatus Sodalis melophagi was described to live in evolutionary early/intermediate state of symbiosis with sheep keds.

== Immune response and effects ==
In lambs, the sheep ked may cause anemia and reduce weight gain. It feeds on the blood of its host, so causes irritation to the sheep, leading it to rub, producing both loss and damage of the wool. It also makes firm, hard nodules that develops on the skin called a cockle, this will reduce the value of the hide. The ked feces also stains the sheep's wool reducing its value. They also transmit Trypanosoma melophagium nonpathogenic protozoan parasite of sheep. A sheep's immune response to keds reduces capillary flow to the skin. Although this response is trying to combat the ked infestation, it also results in a less abundant and lower quality fleece.

== Treatment ==
Adult keds can be killed using treatment dips and sprays most commonly containing ivermectin or pyrethrin. However, the pupal stage is resistant to treatment, so treatment must be repeated at 24- to 28-day intervals. Using insecticides with a 3- to 4-week residual activity would also eliminate emerging adult keds. Additionally, because both adult keds and pupae stages live in the wool of the sheep, shearing can dramatically reduce the ked population. It would be most beneficial to shear before insecticide treatment. Most modern treatments used to control sheep lice will also control sheep ked infestations.

== Disease vector ==
The sheep ked is capable of transmitting bluetongue virus in sheep, though little evidence suggests they are bluetongue disease vectors in nature.

== Sheep resistance to keds ==
Some sheep have been shown to be resistant to the harmful effects of sheep keds. Resistant sheep's skin was histologically examined and showed arteriolar vasoconstriction in addition to fibrinoid degeneration of the tunica media in the lower dermis. This subepidermal region showed an increased infiltration of eosinophils and lymphocytes. The upper dermis of resistant sheep showed an increase of empty capillaries, whereas the upper dermis of susceptible sheep showed capillaries filled with red cells. The resistance of some sheep to keds was due to prolonged cutaneous arteriolar vasoconstriction. In resistant sheep, keds were unable to obtain enough blood and eventually died from starvation.

== Subspecies ==
The subspecies Melophagus ovinus himalayae Maa, 1969 is from Nepal and Tibet. Its host is the yak (Bos grunniens), and domestic cattle.

== See also ==
- Ked itch
