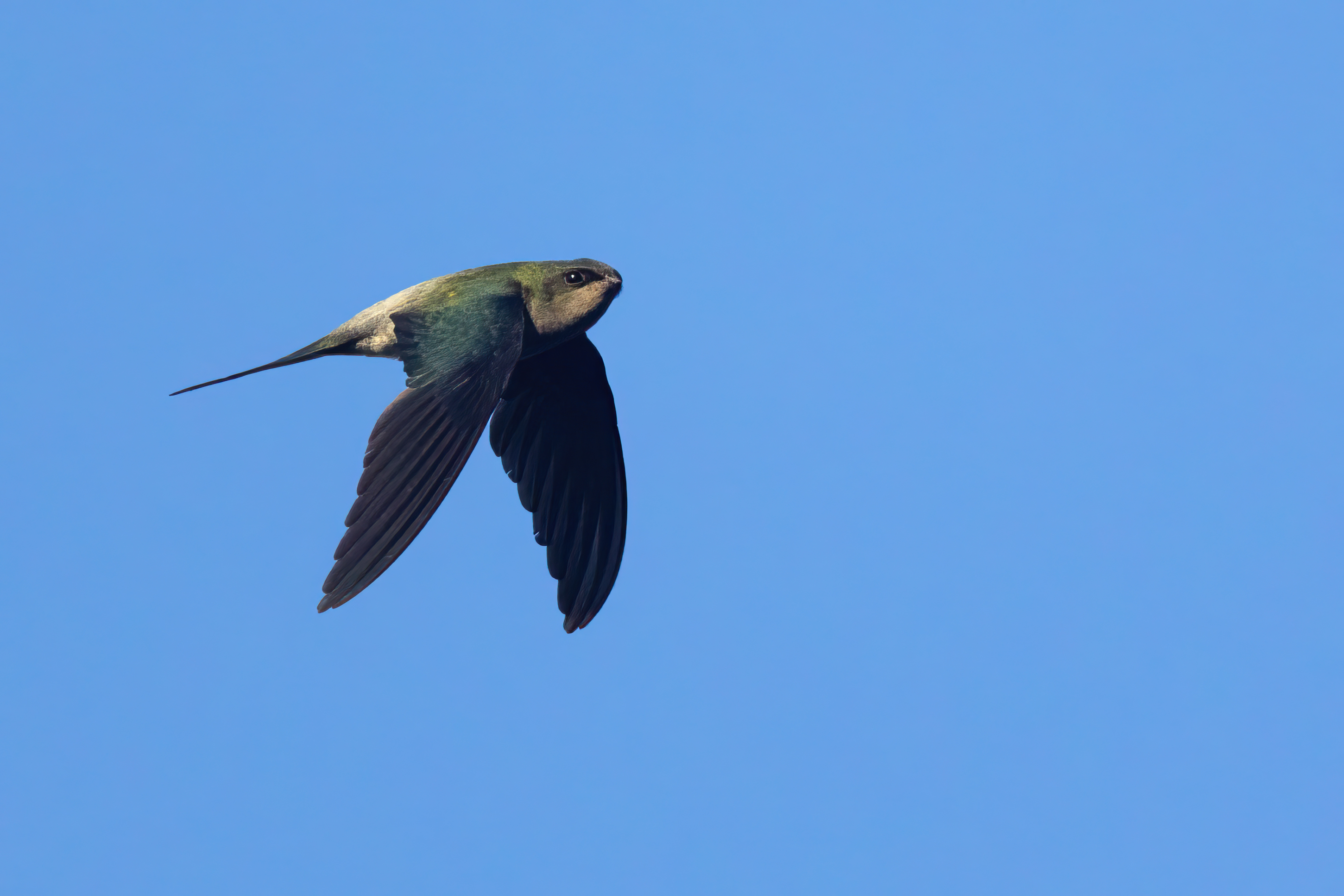

Conservation status
- Least Concern (IUCN 3.1)

Scientific classification
- Kingdom: Animalia
- Phylum: Chordata
- Class: Aves
- Clade: Strisores
- Order: Apodiformes
- Family: Hemiprocnidae
- Genus: Hemiprocne
- Species: H. longipennis

Binomial name
- Hemiprocne longipennis (Rafinesque, 1802)

= Grey-rumped treeswift =

Species of bird

The grey-rumped treeswift (Hemiprocne longipennis) is a species of bird in the Hemiprocnidae family. Currently, four extant species are placed in the family. Like the other members of the Hemiprocnidae, this species is closely related to true swifts, but unlike true swifts, the treeswifts are arboreal, often seen perched on trees, high-tension power transmission lines, and pylons. When perched, the wing tips cross over the tail. This species is commonly found in peninsular Malaysia, but has an extremely large range; there is limited information about population trends.

== Description ==
Adult males have a distinct dark grey throat and chest contrasting with a white belly. Ear coverts are dull orange-red/chestnut-colored. Adult females lack the dull orange-red/chestnut coloration on the ear coverts. When perched, the wing tips cross over across the tail. Both sexes have a greenish sheen to the upper parts.

== Distribution ==
It is found in Brunei, Indonesia, Malaysia, Myanmar, the Philippines, Singapore, and Thailand. Its natural habitats are subtropical or tropical moist lowland forests, subtropical or tropical mangrove forests, and subtropical or tropical moist montane forests.

== Ecology and behaviour ==
The birds occasionally catch insects in flight by sallying from perches. They build nests on tree branches. The half-saucer-shaped nest is made from hardened saliva interspersed with feathers, mosses, and/or flakes of tree bark. The single egg is reportedly attached to nest surface with saliva. Owing to the fragile nature of the nest, it is attached only on one side to the branch. Thus, the bird does not sit directly on the nest for incubation. Similarly, the parent birds reportedly brood by perching on the branch above the nest and fluffing their breast feathers out to cover it.

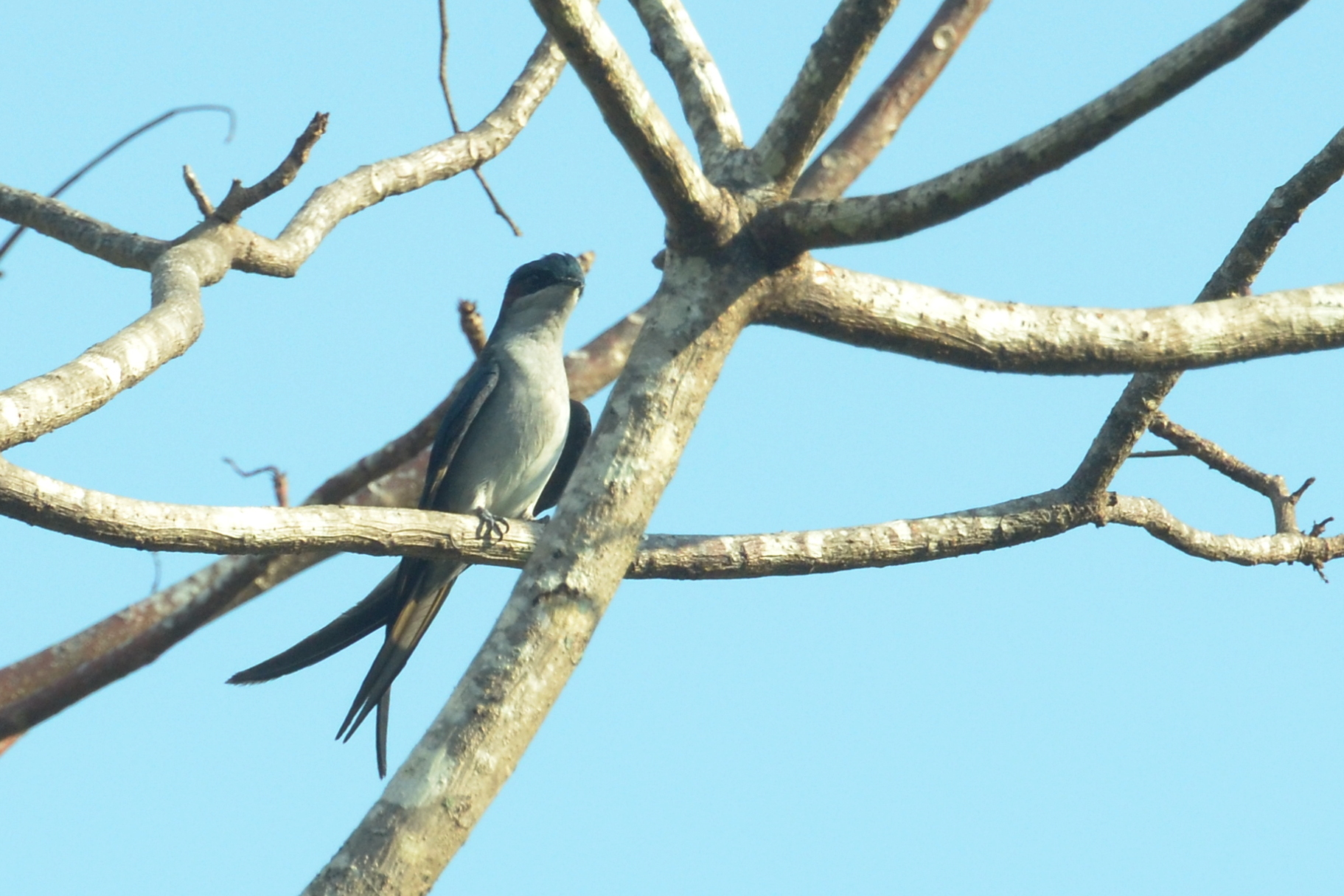
Grey-rumped treeswift at Manado, North Sulawesi

Both sexes help incubate the egg. During the shifting of parental care, the partner perches near the incubating adult and carefully slides over the nest.
