= Melophagus rupicaprinus =

Scientific classification
- Kingdom: Animalia
- Phylum: Arthropoda
- Class: Insecta
- Order: Diptera
- Family: Hippoboscidae
- Genus: Melophagus
- Species: M. rupicaprinus

Binomial name
- Melophagus rupicaprinus Rondani, 1879

Species of fly

Melophagus rupicaprinus is a species of fly in the family Hippoboscidae. It can be found in Europe.
