= Lipoptena pauciseta =

Scientific classification
- Kingdom: Animalia
- Phylum: Arthropoda
- Class: Insecta
- Order: Diptera
- Family: Hippoboscidae
- Genus: Lipoptena
- Species: L. pauciseta

Binomial name
- Lipoptena pauciseta Edwards, 1919

Synonyms
- Lipoptena indicum Rao, Hiregaudar & Alwar, 1964

Species of fly

Lipoptena pauciseta is a species of fly in the family Hippoboscidae. It is found in China, India, Laos, Sumatra, Thailand, and Vietnam.
