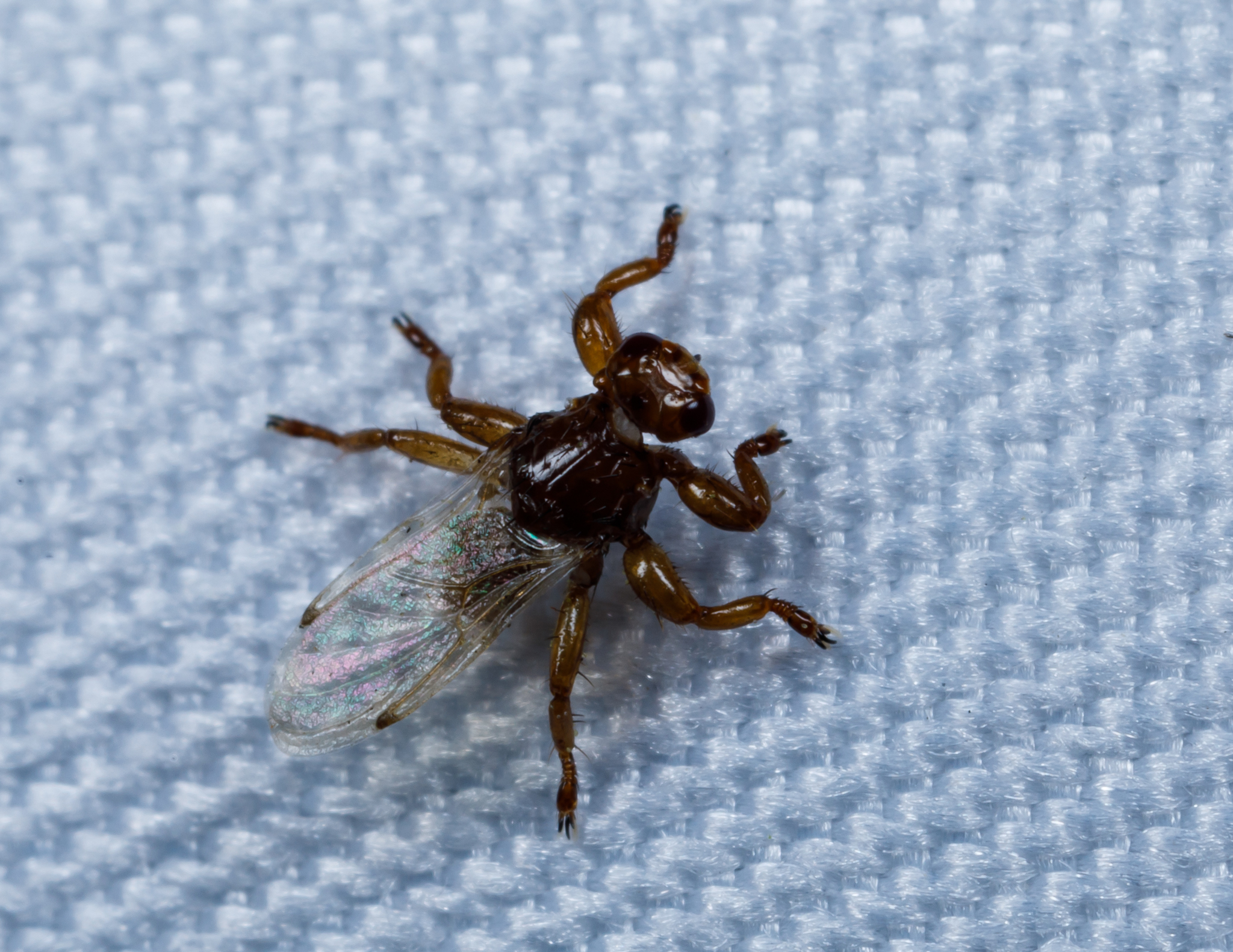

Scientific classification
- Kingdom: Animalia
- Phylum: Arthropoda
- Clade: Pancrustacea
- Class: Insecta
- Order: Diptera
- Family: Hippoboscidae
- Genus: Lipoptena
- Species: L. mazamae

Binomial name
- Lipoptena mazamae Rondani, 1878

Synonyms
- L. odocoilei Byram, 1964; L. conifera Speiser, 1905; L. mexicana Townsend, 1897; L. surinamensis Bau, 1930

= Lipoptena mazamae =

Species of insect

Lipoptena mazamae, the Neotropical deer ked, is a fly from the family Hippoboscidae. They are blood-feeding parasites of the white-tailed deer - Odocoileus virginianus in the southeastern United States and Central America, the red brocket deer - Mazama americana in Mexico to northern Argentina, and also an incidental parasite of domestic cattle, Cougars - Puma concolor, and man.

Deer keds are small brown, flattened flies. Females are slightly larger than males, with a body length of 3.5-4.5 mm for females 3 mm for males. They have a tough protective exoskeleton to prevent them from being crushed. They shed their wings upon finding a suitable host. As in all Hippoboscidae, both males and females are blood feeders.

They are often misidentified as ticks.

The female fly will produce a single larva at a time, retaining the larva internally until it is ready to pupate. The larva feeds on the secretions of a milk gland in the uterus of the female. After three larval instars, a white pre-pupa which immediately forms a hard dark puparium. The pupa is usually deposited where the deer slept overnight. When the pupa has completed its pupation, a winged adult emerges and flies in search of a suitable host. On finding one, the fly sheds its wings and is permanently associated with the same host. This is typical of most members of the family Hippoboscidae.

L. mazamae are known to carry several species of the Bartonella bacterium, but it has not yet been positively proved whether they are active vectors of Bartonella infections, or just carry the bacterium as a by product of their blood feeding habits.
