= Christian Ludwig Nitzsch =

German zoologist (1782–1837)

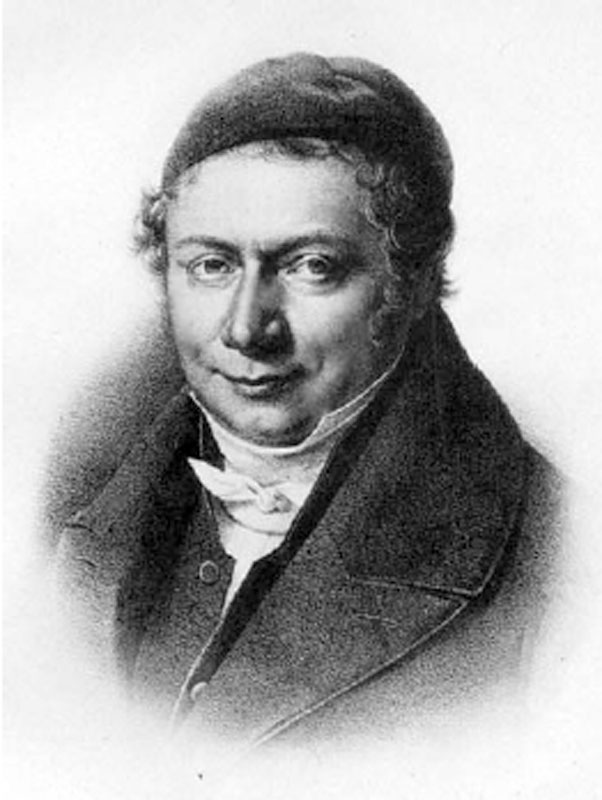
Christian Ludwig Nitzsch

Christian Ludwig Nitzsch (3 September 1782 – 16 August 1837) was a German zoologist. He is best remembered for his approach to classifying birds on the basis of their feather tract distributions or pterylosis of their young.

== Career ==
He was professor of zoology at the University of Halle. While his primary interest lay in ornithology, Nitzsch published studies on other topics, including diatoms (the diatom genus Nitzschia is named after him). He is also widely credited with producing the first systematic zoological studies of lice, Nitzsch Ch. L., Darstellung der Familien und Gattungen der Thierinsecten (insecta epizoica). Magazin fur die Entomologie, Germar, Zincken, Bd.3 (1818). Zoology owes important insights to his works "Über die Formenkenntnis, Anatomie und Entwicklungsgeschichte der Parasiten", "Über die Anatomie der Vögel" and "Der Bau der Infusorien". Nitzsch, who as an excellent zoologist also dealt with the anatomy of birds, developed dissection techniques and also knew how to inspire in his lectures. He died in 1837 as a result of a stroke. In 1832, he was elected a foreign member of the Royal Swedish Academy of Sciences.

== Works ==
- De respiratione animalium, 1808
- „Die Familien der Thierinsekten“ im Germar's Magazin für Entomologie, Band 3 1818
- „Zur Geschichte der Thierinsektenkunde“ in der Zeitschrift für gesammelte Naturwissenschaften 5 Band 1855
- „Charakteristik der Federlinge“ in Zeitschrift für gesammelte Naturwissenschaften Band 9 1857
- „Beiträge zur Infusorienkunde“ in Neue Schriften der naturforschenden Gesellschaft in Halle Band 3 Heft 1 1817
- „Anatomie der Vögel“ in Meckels deutschen Archiv für Physiologie Band 1 1815 Band 2 1816, Band 3 1817 Band 6 1820 und Band 11 1826
- Osteographischen Beiträge zur Naturgeschichte der Vögel, 1811
- System der Pterylographie, bei Burmeister 1840
- Observationes de Avium arteria carotide communi, (Halle) 1829
- “Charakteristik der Federlinge“ in Zeitschrift für gesammelte Naturwissenschaften Band 9 1857
- Pterlyographiae Avium pars prior, (Halle) 1833 — Traduit en anglais sous le titre de Nitzsch's Pterylography à la Ray Society en 1867.
- “Zur Geschichte der Thierinsektenkunde“ in der Zeitschrift für gesammelte Naturwissenschaften 5 Band 1855
- “Beiträge zur Infusorienkunde“ in Neue Schriften der naturforschenden Gesellschaft in Halle Band 3 Heft 1 1817
- “Anatomie der Vögel“ in Meckels deutschen Archiv für Physiologie Band 1 1815 Band 2 1816, Band 3 1817 Band 6 1820 und Band 11 1826
- “Osteographischen Beiträge zur Naturgeschichte der Vögel“ 1811

== Literature ==
- Walter Friedensburg „Geschichte der Universität Wittenberg“ Verlag Max Niemeyer Halle (Saale) 1917
- „Album Academicae Vitebergensis“ von (1710–1812) bearbeitet von Fritz Juntke im Max Niemeyer Verlag Halle (Saale) Band 5 1966
