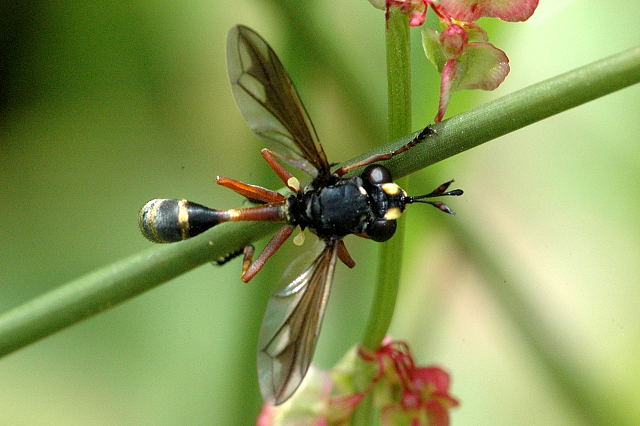
- Physocephala rufipes

Scientific classification
- Kingdom: Animalia
- Phylum: Arthropoda
- Clade: Pancrustacea
- Class: Insecta
- Order: Diptera
- Family: Conopidae
- Subfamily: Conopinae
- Tribe: Physocephalini

Genera
- See text

= Physocephalini =

Tribe of flies

Physocephalini is a tribe of fly from the family Conopidae.

== Genera ==
- Genus Physocephala Schiner, 1861
- Genus Physoconops Szilady, 1926
