= Physoconops bulbirostris =

Scientific classification
- Kingdom: Animalia
- Phylum: Arthropoda
- Class: Insecta
- Order: Diptera
- Family: Conopidae
- Genus: Physoconops
- Species: P. bulbirostris

Binomial name
- Physoconops bulbirostris (Loew, 1853)

Synonyms
- Conops bulbirostris Loew, 1853

Species of fly

Physoconops bulbirostris is a species in the family Conopidae ("thick-headed flies"), in the order Diptera ("flies").
