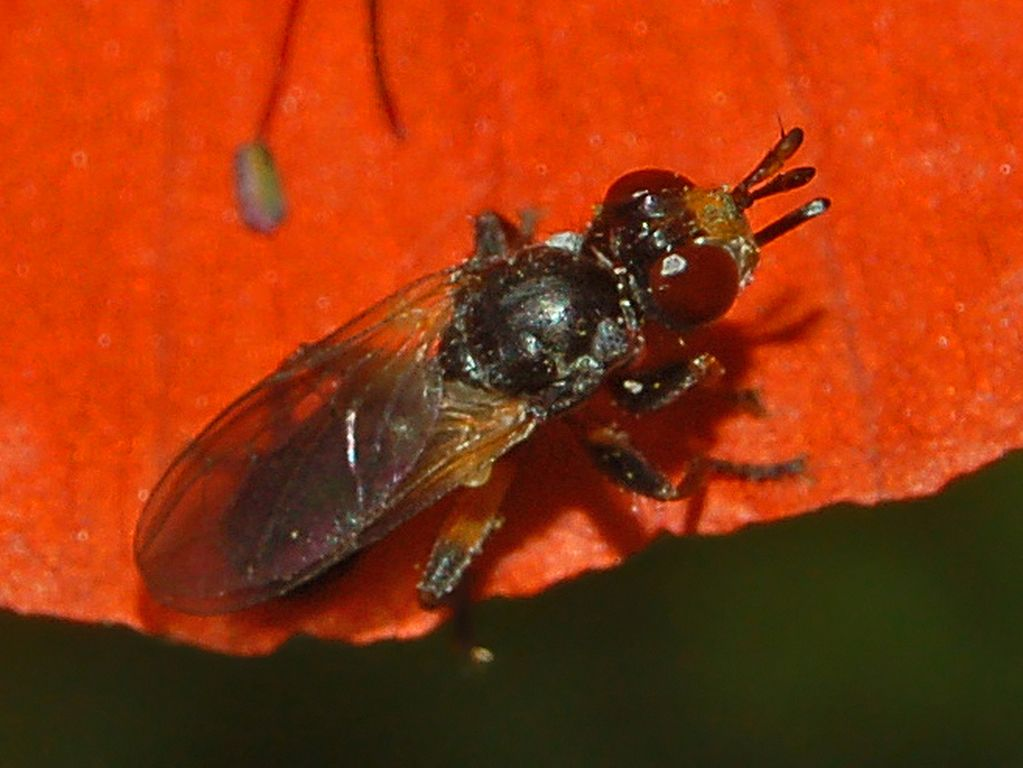
- Thecophora pusilla. Female, dorsal view

Scientific classification
- Kingdom: Animalia
- Phylum: Arthropoda
- Clade: Pancrustacea
- Class: Insecta
- Order: Diptera
- Family: Conopidae
- Genus: Physocephala
- Species: P. pusilla

Binomial name
- Physocephala pusilla (Meigen, 1804/1824)

Synonyms
- Conops pusilla Meigen 1804; Myopa pusilla Meigen, 1824; Thecophora pusilla (Meigen, 1824)

= Physocephala pusilla =

Species of fly

Physocephala pusilla is a species of fly belonging to the family Conopidae, subfamily Myopinae.

== Taxonomy ==
Some authors consider Thecophora pusilla a synonym of Thecophora cinerascens Meigen, 1804.

== Distribution ==
This species is mainly present in most of Europe (Albania, Austria, Belgium, Bulgaria, Czech Republic, Denmark, Finland, France, Germany, Hungary, Italy, Lithuania, Norway, Poland, Romania, Slovakia, Spain, Switzerland and The Netherlands).

== Description ==
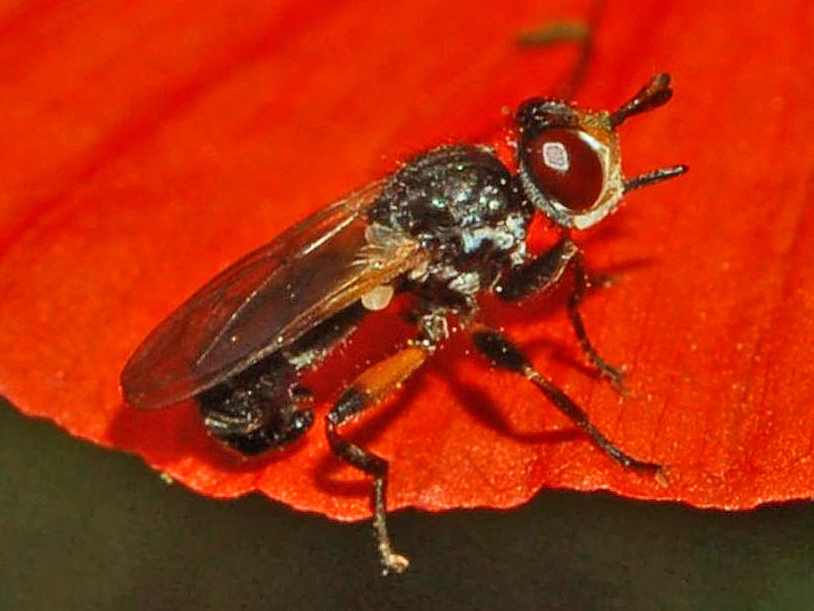
Side view of a female on Papaver rhoeas

.

Thecophora pusilla can reach a length of 3–5 mm (0.12–0.20 in). This species appears to be highly variable. Thorax and abdomen of this very small conopid is mainly greyish-black, with a broad and relatively high theca in the females. On mesonotum submedial dorsal stripes are absent or very weakly developed. The head is quite large, with large reddish eyes. The lower part of frons is pale, while the upper part and the ocellar triangle are uniformly black. The snout is elongated with narrow white cheeks, Femurs 1 and 2 are black, while femur 3 is pale on its basal half. Tibiae are pale only near the base. The wings are blackish, but the base is yellowed.

== Biology ==
The adults of this fly can be encountered feeding on nectar of flowers of various plants (Crepis biennis, Papaver rhoeas, etc). Their larvae are endoparasites of small solitary bees.
