= Dalmannia nigriceps =

Scientific classification
- Kingdom: Animalia
- Phylum: Arthropoda
- Class: Insecta
- Order: Diptera
- Family: Conopidae
- Genus: Dalmannia
- Species: D. nigriceps

Binomial name
- Dalmannia nigriceps Loew, 1866

Species of fly

Dalmannia nigriceps is a species in the family Conopidae ("thick-headed flies"), in the order Diptera ("flies").
