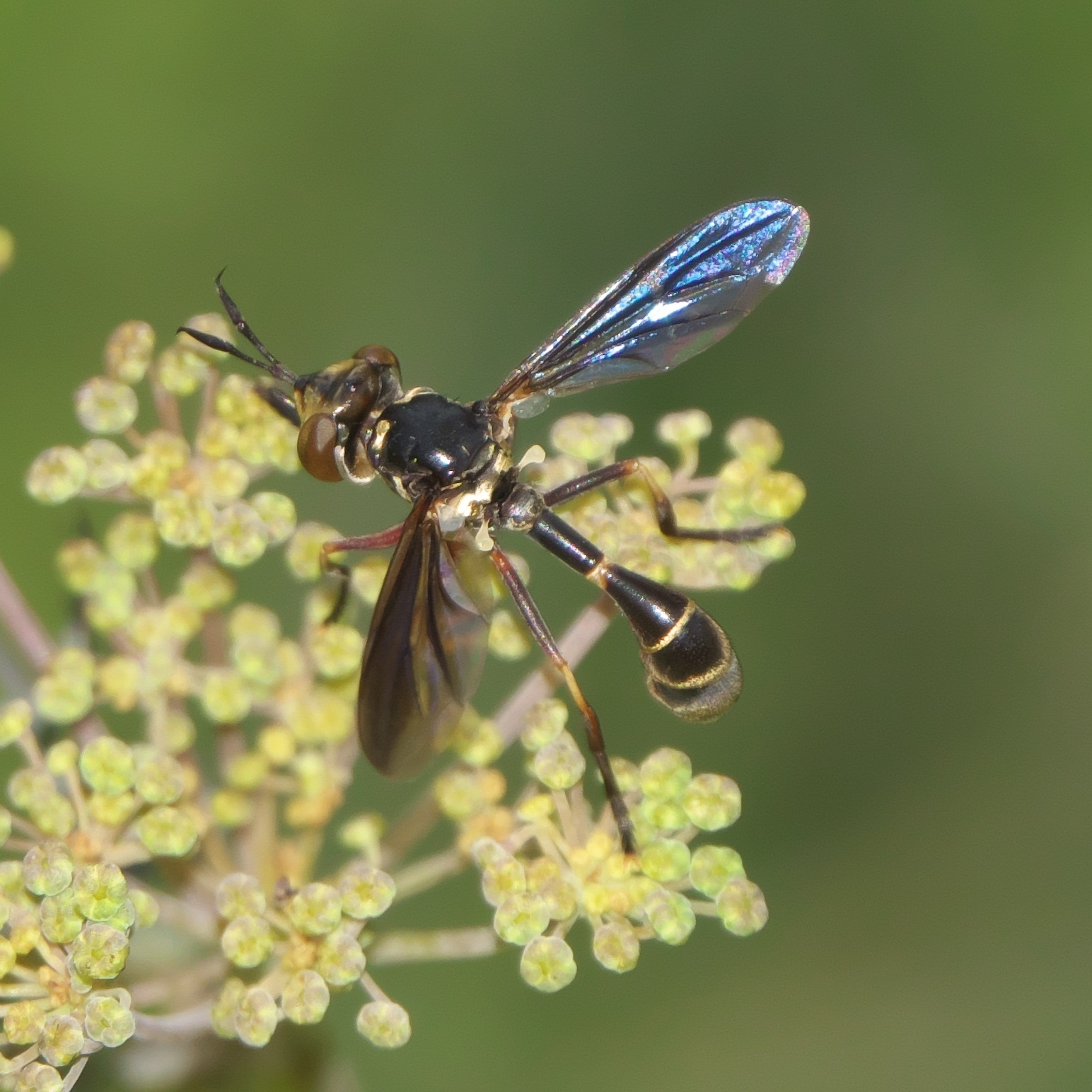
- Physoconops brachyrhynchus, Oklahoma

Scientific classification
- Domain: Eukaryota
- Kingdom: Animalia
- Phylum: Arthropoda
- Class: Insecta
- Order: Diptera
- Family: Conopidae
- Genus: Physoconops
- Species: P. brachyrhynchus

Binomial name
- Physoconops brachyrhynchus (Macquart, 1843)

Synonyms
- Conops brachyrhynchus Macquart, 1843; Conops fenestratus Krober, 1915; Conops xanthopareus Williston, 1882

= Physoconops brachyrhynchus =

Species of fly

Physoconops brachyrhynchus is a species of thick-headed fly in the family Conopidae.
