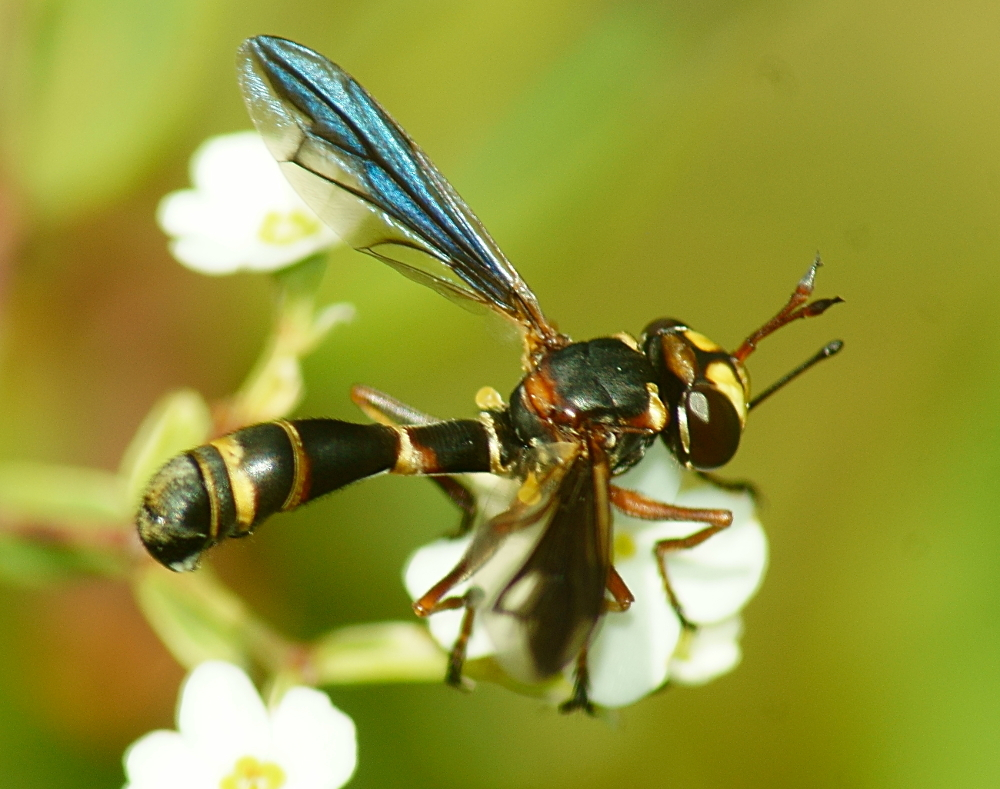

Scientific classification
- Domain: Eukaryota
- Kingdom: Animalia
- Phylum: Arthropoda
- Class: Insecta
- Order: Diptera
- Family: Conopidae
- Genus: Physocephala
- Species: P. marginata

Binomial name
- Physocephala marginata (Say, 1823)

Synonyms
- Conops marginata Say, 1823; Physocephala dakotensis Van Duzee, 1934; Physocephala stylifer Van Duzee, 1934

= Physocephala marginata =

Species of fly

Physocephala marginata is a species of thick-headed fly in the family Conopidae. It is a parasite of Anthophora abrupta bees, although pupation occurs only after death of the host bee.
