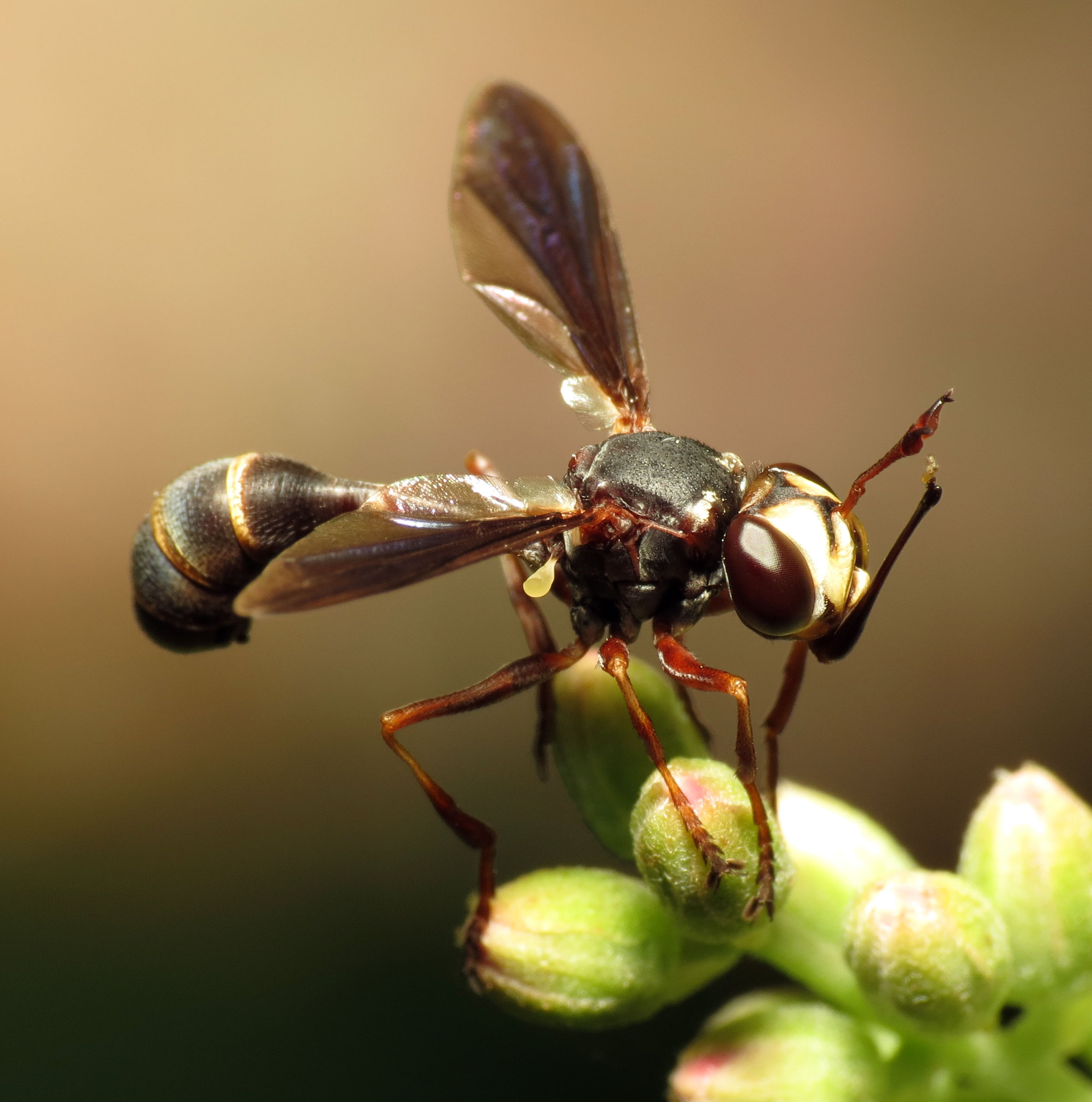

Scientific classification
- Domain: Eukaryota
- Kingdom: Animalia
- Phylum: Arthropoda
- Class: Insecta
- Order: Diptera
- Family: Conopidae
- Genus: Physocephala
- Species: P. sagittaria

Binomial name
- Physocephala sagittaria (Say, 1823)

Synonyms
- Conops aethiops Walker, 1849; Conops castanoptera Loew, 1853; Conops dimidiata Walker, 1852; Conops genualis Loew, 1853; Conops sagittaria Say, 1823; Physocephala ruficornis Van Duzee, 1934

= Physocephala sagittaria =

Species of fly

Physocephala sagittaria is a species of thick-headed fly in the family Conopidae. Larvae develop and pupate within the bodies of Bombus auricomus bees.

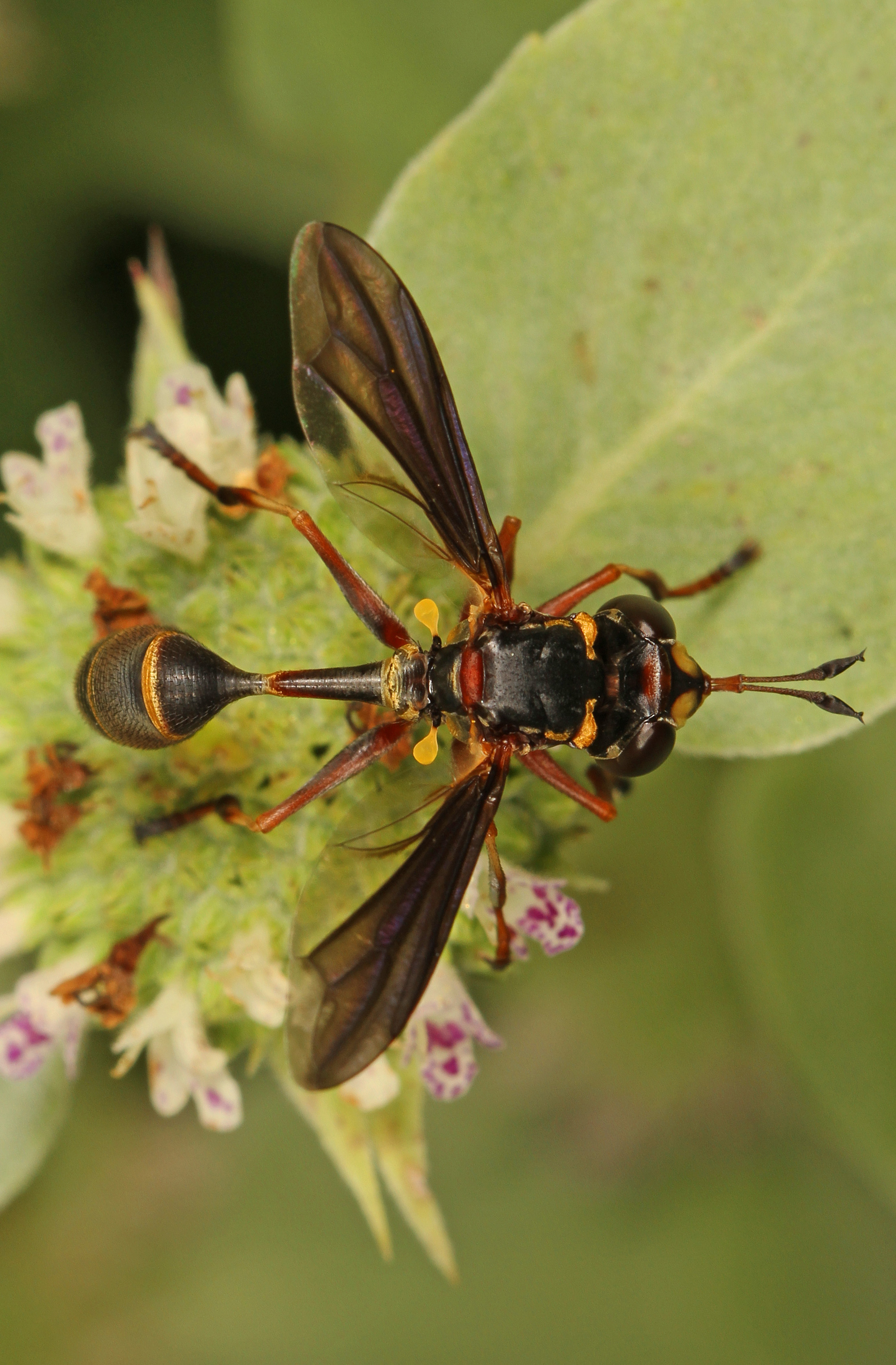
