= Physoconops obscuripennis =

Scientific classification
- Domain: Eukaryota
- Kingdom: Animalia
- Phylum: Arthropoda
- Class: Insecta
- Order: Diptera
- Family: Conopidae
- Genus: Physoconops
- Species: P. obscuripennis

Binomial name
- Physoconops obscuripennis (Williston, 1882)

Synonyms
- Conops foxi Van Duzee, 1927; Conops obscuripennis Williston, 1882

Species of fly

Physoconops obscuripennis is a species of thick-headed fly in the family Conopidae.
