= Overwintering =

Process by which some organisms pass through or wait out the winter season

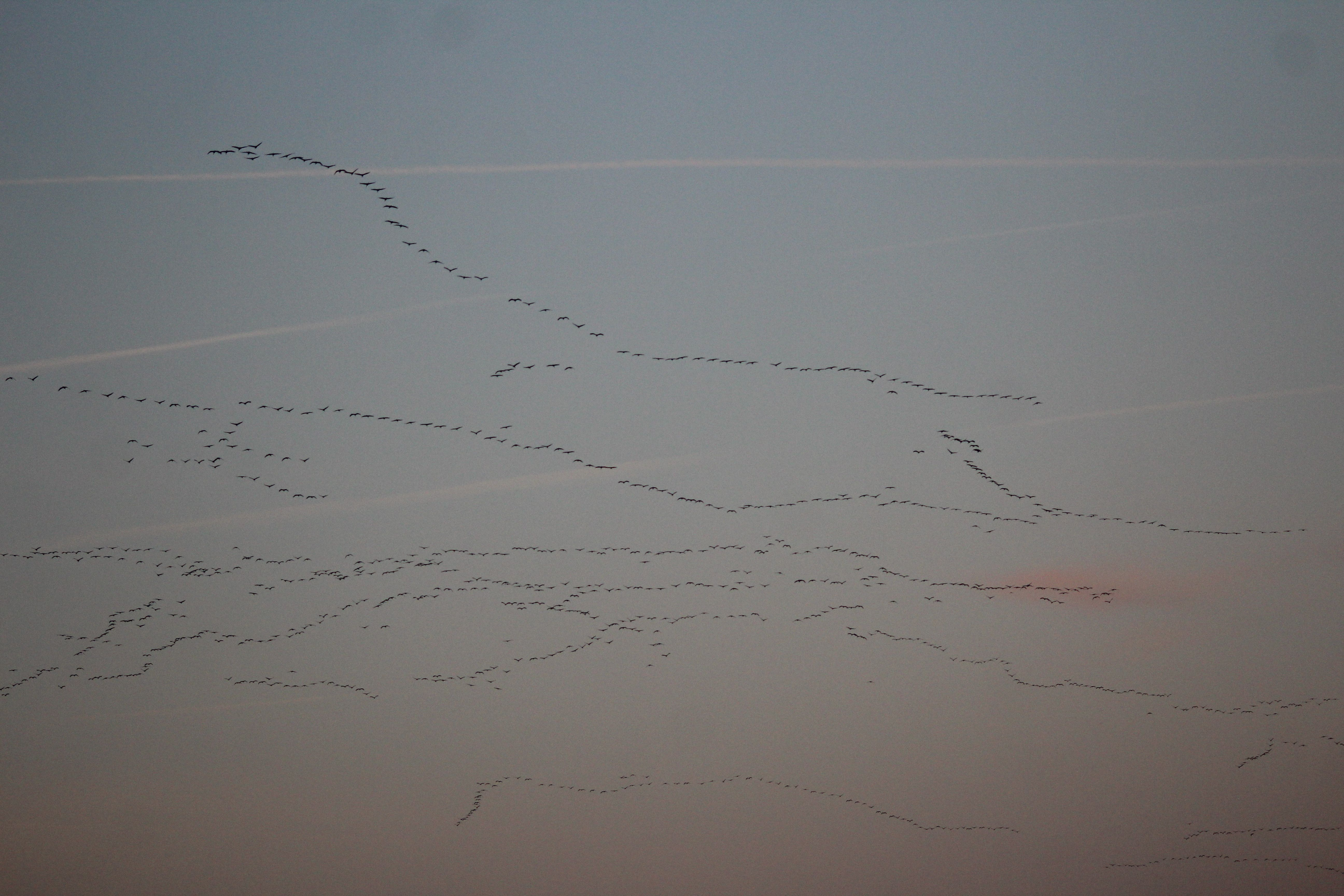
Migration of cranes

Overwintering is the process by which some organisms pass through or wait out the winter season, or pass through that period of the year when "winter" conditions (cold or sub-zero temperatures, ice, snow, limited food supplies) make normal activity or even survival difficult or near impossible. In some cases "winter" is characterized not necessarily by cold but by dry conditions; passing through such periods could likewise be called overwintering.

Hibernation and migration are the two major ways in which overwintering is accomplished. Animals may also go into a state of reduced physiological activity known as torpor.

Overwintering occurs in several classes of lifeform.

== Insects ==
Monarch butterflies overwintering on a Monterey cypress tree in Pacific Grove, California

In entomology, overwintering is how an insect passes the winter season. Many insects overwinter as adults, pupae, or eggs. This can be done inside buildings, under tree bark, or beneath fallen leaves or other plant matter on the ground, among other places. All such overwintering sites shield the insect from adverse conditions associated with winter. Activity almost completely ceases until conditions become more favourable. One example is the mourning cloak butterfly, which experiences advantages to overwintering in its desired locations by being one of the first butterflies to emerge after a cold winter. Another example are the eggs of the forest tent caterpillar moth which overwinter tightly packed on tree branches. Other insects, such as the monarch butterfly, migrate and overwinter in warmer areas. Additionally, the ghost moth overwinters as a larva. The common brimstone, found across a broad geographic range, overwinters for 7 months to wait for the development of their larval host plants. Another unique butterfly, the large white, will only overwinter in southern Eurasia; they are not seen overwintering elsewhere. Some species of parasitic conopid flies, such as P. tibialis, are known to overwinter inside of the corpse of their bee/wasp hosts before emerging in the spring. The queens of the yellow-faced bumblebee (Bombus vosnesenskii) will over-winter, and then emerge early in the flight season to obtain the best available subterranean nests. Lastly, many species of Lasioglossum, including L. hemichalceum (which is a common sweat bee), will overwinter in underground nests before emerging in the spring to start new colonies.

== Birds ==
White stork migration map

Many birds migrate and then overwinter in regions where temperatures are warmer or food is more readily available, in Europe for example common crane and white storks. Some birds, however, such as black-capped chickadees, Golden-crowned kinglets, woodpeckers, and corvids, instead remain in colder areas throughout the winter, often remaining in groups for warmth.

== Plants ==
Plants overwintering in a polytunnel

Plants are sometimes said to overwinter. At such times, growth of vegetative tissues and reproductive structures becomes minimal or ceases completely. For plants, overwintering often involves restricted water supplies and reduced light exposure. In the spring following overwintering many plants will enter their flowering stage. Farmers and gardeners use a process of "overwintering" to achieve early spring harvests of some crops by planting a species in fall, often under the protection of high or low tunnels. In plant pathology, overwintering is where a plant pathogen survives the winter, during which its normal crop host species is not growing, by transferring to an alternative host, living freely in the soil or surviving on plant refuse such as discarded potatoes.

== People ==
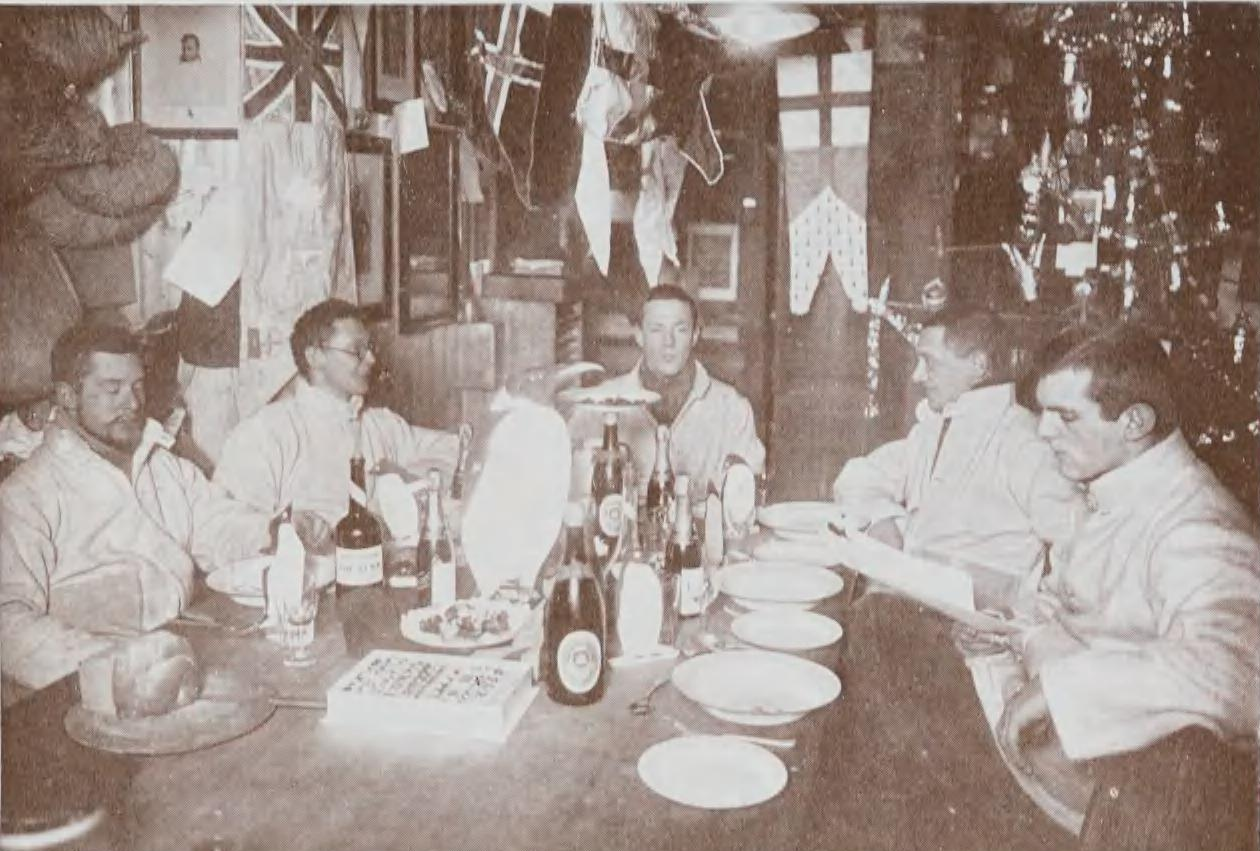
Military officers celebrating Midwinter Day

People are also described from time to time as overwintering. This was especially true in the past during the exploration of the planet when people had to pass the winter in places not ideally suited for winter survival, and even today in the polar regions.

Used interchangeably with the term winter-over, the most common usage of the term today is by the caretaker winter crews remaining at Antarctic research stations during the winter months in the Southern Hemisphere between March and September. In contrast to the population of thousands of scientists residing on Antarctica during the summer, the hardy crew volunteering to spend the winter to maintain the facilities do so knowing the difficulty of obtaining outside assistance, and the psychological effects of spending several weeks in complete darkness.

Midwinter Day on the Winter solstice is a major holiday for those spending the winter in Antarctica as it serves to mark the halfway point of their time with less days until resupply or until the sun rises over the horizon again as has elapsed. British research stations typically mark the day with a special meal, a gift exchange, a special broadcast from the BBC, and a screening of John Carpenter's 1982 film, The Thing.

People may be said to overwinter when they temporarily move to warmer areas during the months of prevailing cold weather in northern latitudes, such as people from various parts of North America staying in Florida, Arizona, or New Mexico (among other places) for parts of November to March.
