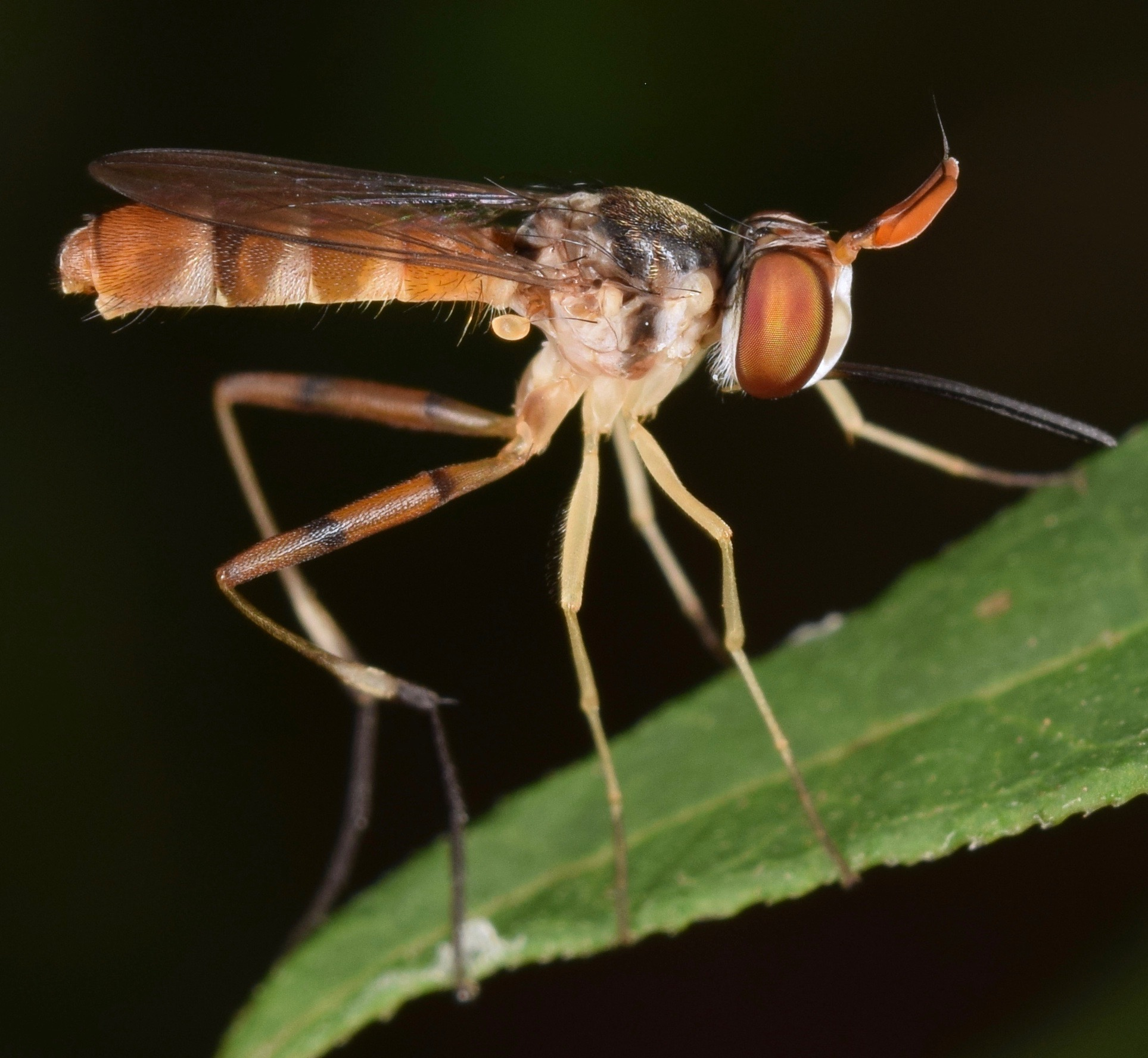

Scientific classification
- Domain: Eukaryota
- Kingdom: Animalia
- Phylum: Arthropoda
- Class: Insecta
- Order: Diptera
- Family: Conopidae
- Genus: Stylogaster
- Species: S. neglecta

Binomial name
- Stylogaster neglecta Williston, 1883

= Stylogaster neglecta =

Species of fly

Stylogaster neglecta is a species of thick-headed flies (insects in the family Conopidae).
