= Physoconops floridanus =

Scientific classification
- Domain: Eukaryota
- Kingdom: Animalia
- Phylum: Arthropoda
- Class: Insecta
- Order: Diptera
- Family: Conopidae
- Genus: Physoconops
- Species: P. floridanus

Binomial name
- Physoconops floridanus Camras, 1955

Species of fly

Physoconops floridanus, the Florida physoconops, is a species of thick-headed fly in the family Conopidae.
