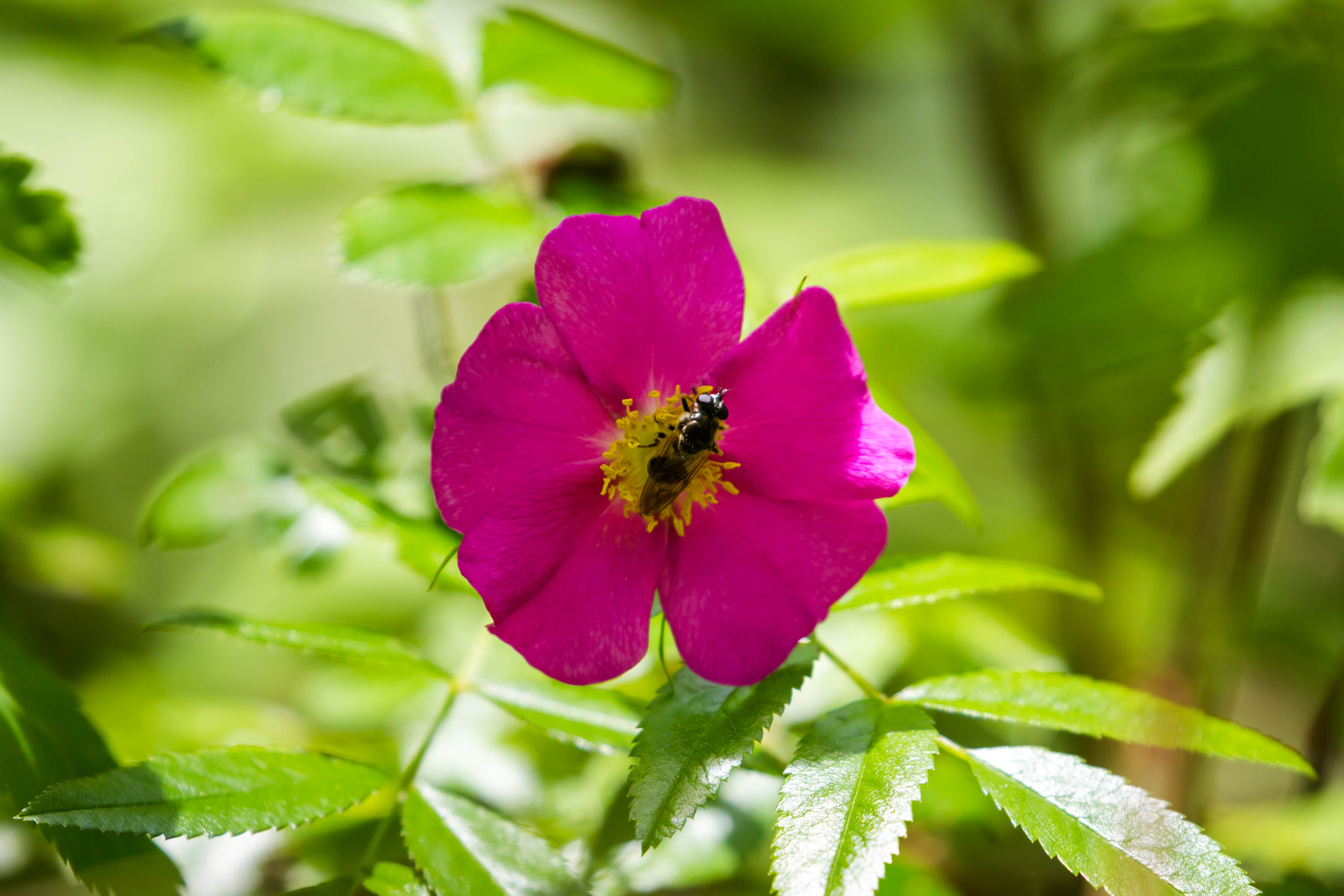

Scientific classification
- Domain: Eukaryota
- Kingdom: Animalia
- Phylum: Arthropoda
- Class: Insecta
- Order: Diptera
- Family: Conopidae
- Genus: Dalmannia
- Species: D. vitiosa

Binomial name
- Dalmannia vitiosa Coquillett, 1892

= Dalmannia vitiosa =

Species of fly

Dalmannia vitiosa is a species of thick-headed flies in the family Conopidae.
