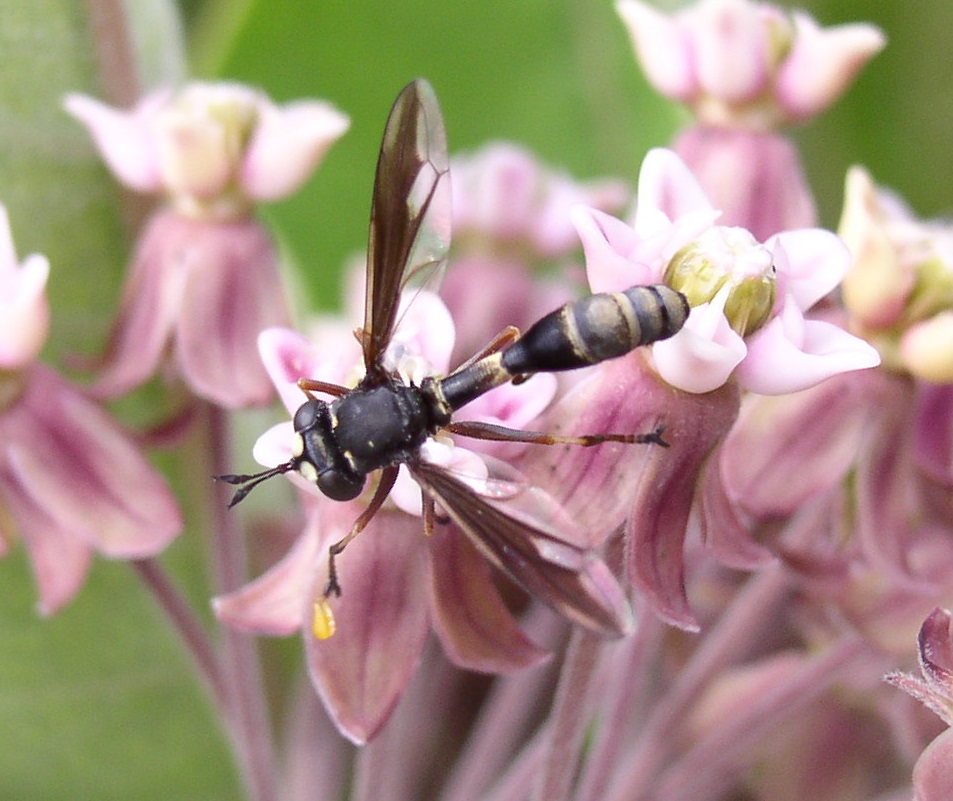
- Male with milkweed pollinia on front leg

Scientific classification
- Domain: Eukaryota
- Kingdom: Animalia
- Phylum: Arthropoda
- Class: Insecta
- Order: Diptera
- Family: Conopidae
- Genus: Physocephala
- Species: P. furcillata

Binomial name
- Physocephala furcillata (Williston, 1882)

Synonyms
- Conops furcillata Williston, 1882; Physocephala lucida Van Duzee, 1931

= Physocephala furcillata =

Species of fly

Physocephala furcillata is a species of thick-headed fly in the family Conopidae.
