= Physoconops discalis =

Scientific classification
- Domain: Eukaryota
- Kingdom: Animalia
- Phylum: Arthropoda
- Class: Insecta
- Order: Diptera
- Family: Conopidae
- Genus: Physoconops
- Species: P. discalis

Binomial name
- Physoconops discalis (Williston, 1892)

Synonyms
- Conops semifuscus Banks, 1916

Species of fly

Physoconops discalis is a species of thick-headed fly in the family Conopidae.
