= Physoconops fronto =

Scientific classification
- Domain: Eukaryota
- Kingdom: Animalia
- Phylum: Arthropoda
- Class: Insecta
- Order: Diptera
- Family: Conopidae
- Genus: Physoconops
- Species: P. fronto

Binomial name
- Physoconops fronto (Williston, 1885)

Synonyms
- Conops argentifacies Van Duzee, 1927; Conops fraterculus Van Duzee, 1927; Conops fronto Williston, 1885; Conops pulchellus Krober, 1915; Conops rubicundulus Van Duzee, 1927

Species of fly

Physoconops fronto is a species of thick-headed fly in the family Conopidae.
