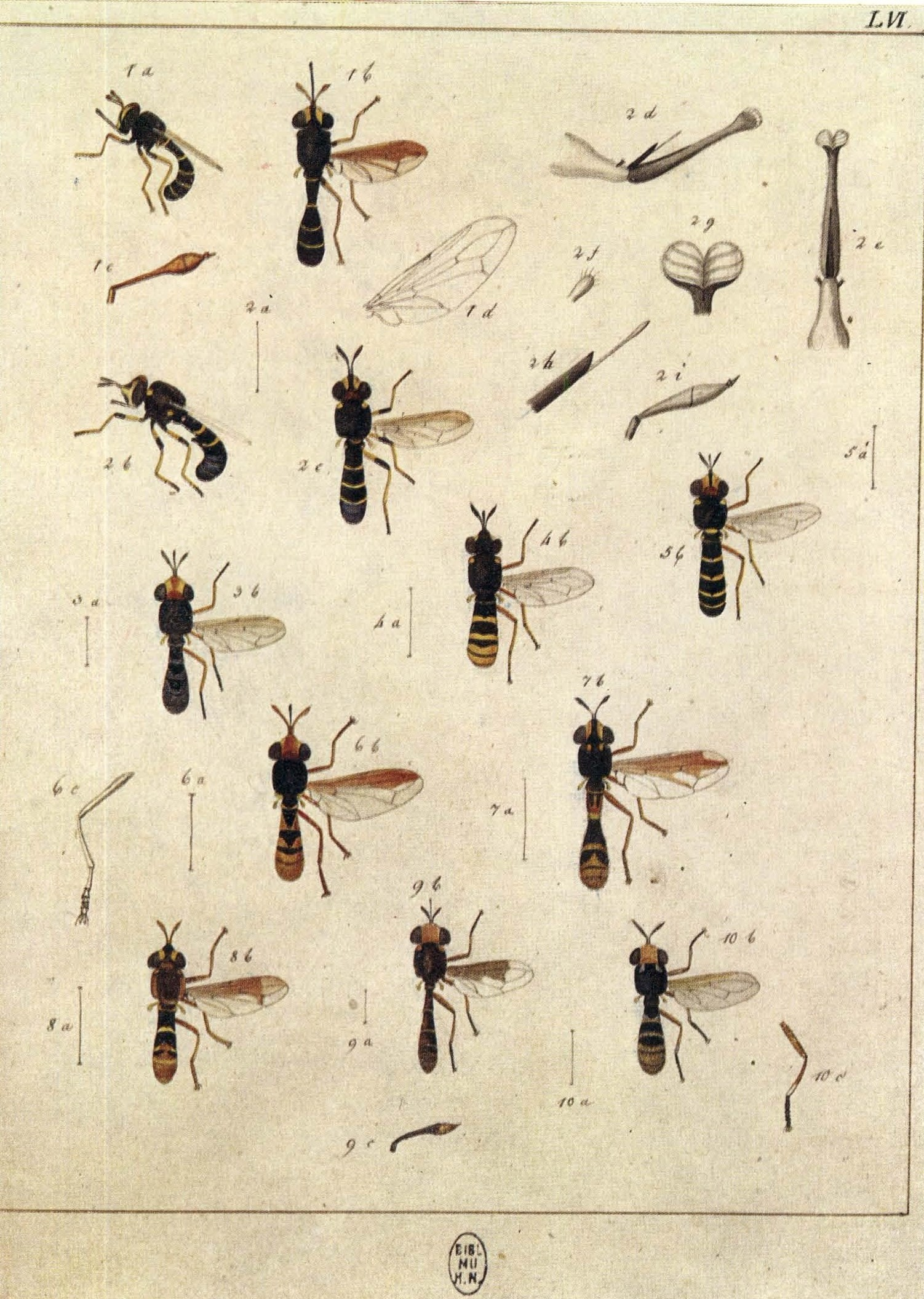
- Illustration in Johann Wilhelm Meigen Europäischen Zweiflügeligen Figure 1

Scientific classification
- Kingdom: Animalia
- Phylum: Arthropoda
- Clade: Pancrustacea
- Class: Insecta
- Order: Diptera
- Family: Conopidae
- Genus: Physocephala
- Species: P. nigra

Binomial name
- Physocephala nigra (De Geer, 1776)

Synonyms
- Conops nigra De Geer, 1776

= Physocephala nigra =

Species of fly

Physocephala nigra is a species of fly from the genus Physocephala in the family Conopidae. Their larvae are endoparasites of bumble bees of the genus Bombus.
