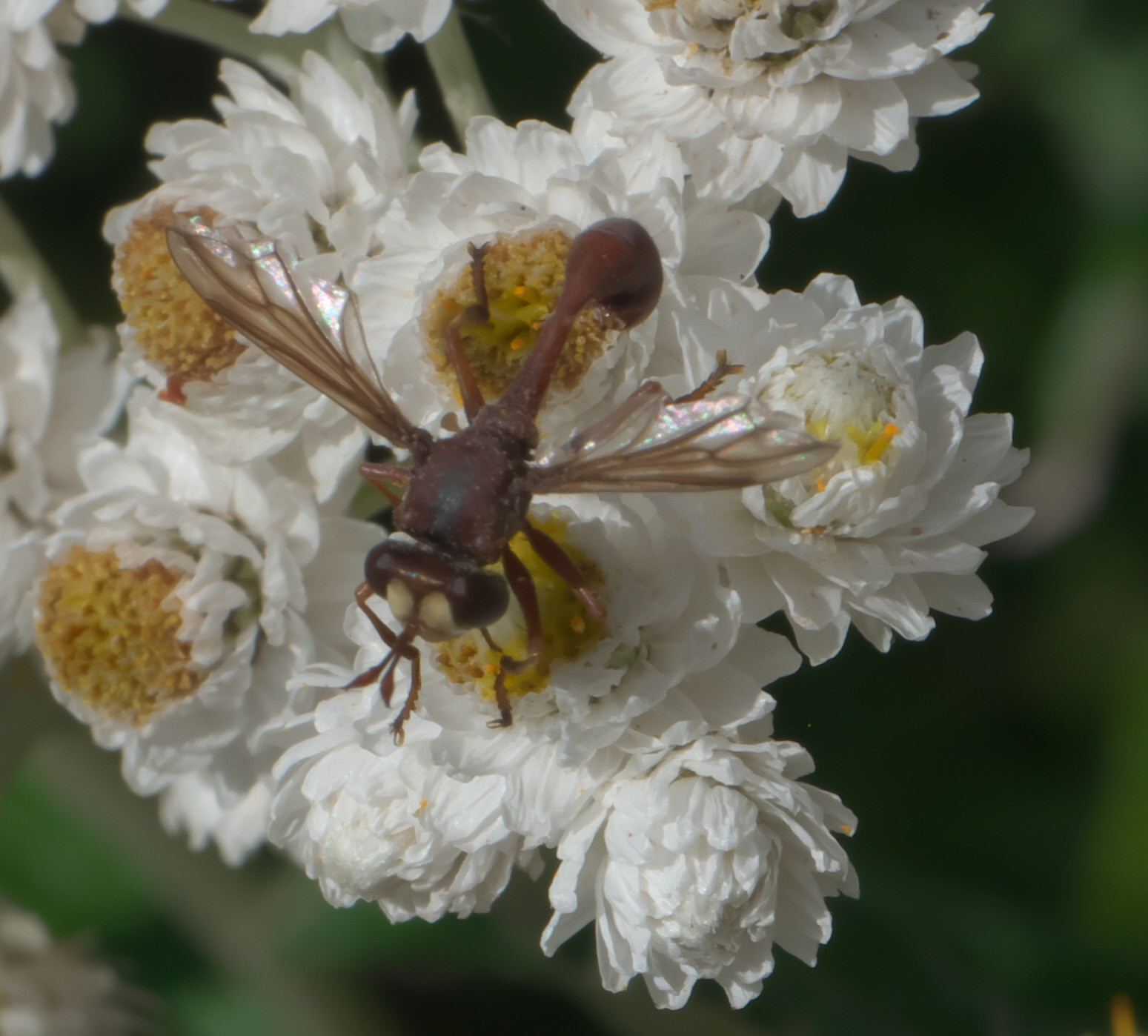

Scientific classification
- Domain: Eukaryota
- Kingdom: Animalia
- Phylum: Arthropoda
- Class: Insecta
- Order: Diptera
- Family: Conopidae
- Genus: Physocephala
- Species: P. burgessi

Binomial name
- Physocephala burgessi (Williston, 1882)

Synonyms
- Conops burgessi Williston, 1882; Physocephala brevirostris Van Duzee, 1927

= Physocephala burgessi =

Species of fly

Physocephala burgessi is a species of thick-headed fly in the family Conopidae.
