= Physoconops gracilis =

Scientific classification
- Domain: Eukaryota
- Kingdom: Animalia
- Phylum: Arthropoda
- Class: Insecta
- Order: Diptera
- Family: Conopidae
- Genus: Physoconops
- Species: P. gracilis

Binomial name
- Physoconops gracilis (Williston, 1885)

Synonyms
- Conops gracilis Williston, 1885

Species of fly

Physoconops gracilis is a species of thick-headed fly in the family Conopidae.
