= Physocephala floridana =

Scientific classification
- Domain: Eukaryota
- Kingdom: Animalia
- Phylum: Arthropoda
- Class: Insecta
- Order: Diptera
- Family: Conopidae
- Genus: Physocephala
- Species: P. floridana

Binomial name
- Physocephala floridana Camras, 1957

Species of fly

Physocephala floridana is a species of thick-headed fly in the family Conopidae.
