= Stylogaster biannulata =

Scientific classification
- Domain: Eukaryota
- Kingdom: Animalia
- Phylum: Arthropoda
- Class: Insecta
- Order: Diptera
- Family: Conopidae
- Genus: Stylogaster
- Species: S. biannulata

Binomial name
- Stylogaster biannulata (Say, 1823)

Synonyms
- Myopa biannulata Say, 1823; Stylomyia confusa Westwood, 1852

Species of fly

Stylogaster biannulata is a species of thick-headed flies (insects in the family Conopidae).
