= Physoconops analis =

Scientific classification
- Kingdom: Animalia
- Phylum: Arthropoda
- Class: Insecta
- Order: Diptera
- Family: Conopidae
- Genus: Physoconops
- Species: P. analis

Binomial name
- Physoconops analis (Fabricius, 1805)

Synonyms
- Conops analis Fabricius, 1805; Conops angustifrons Williston, 1892

Species of fly

Physoconops analis is a species of thick-headed fly in the family Conopidae.
