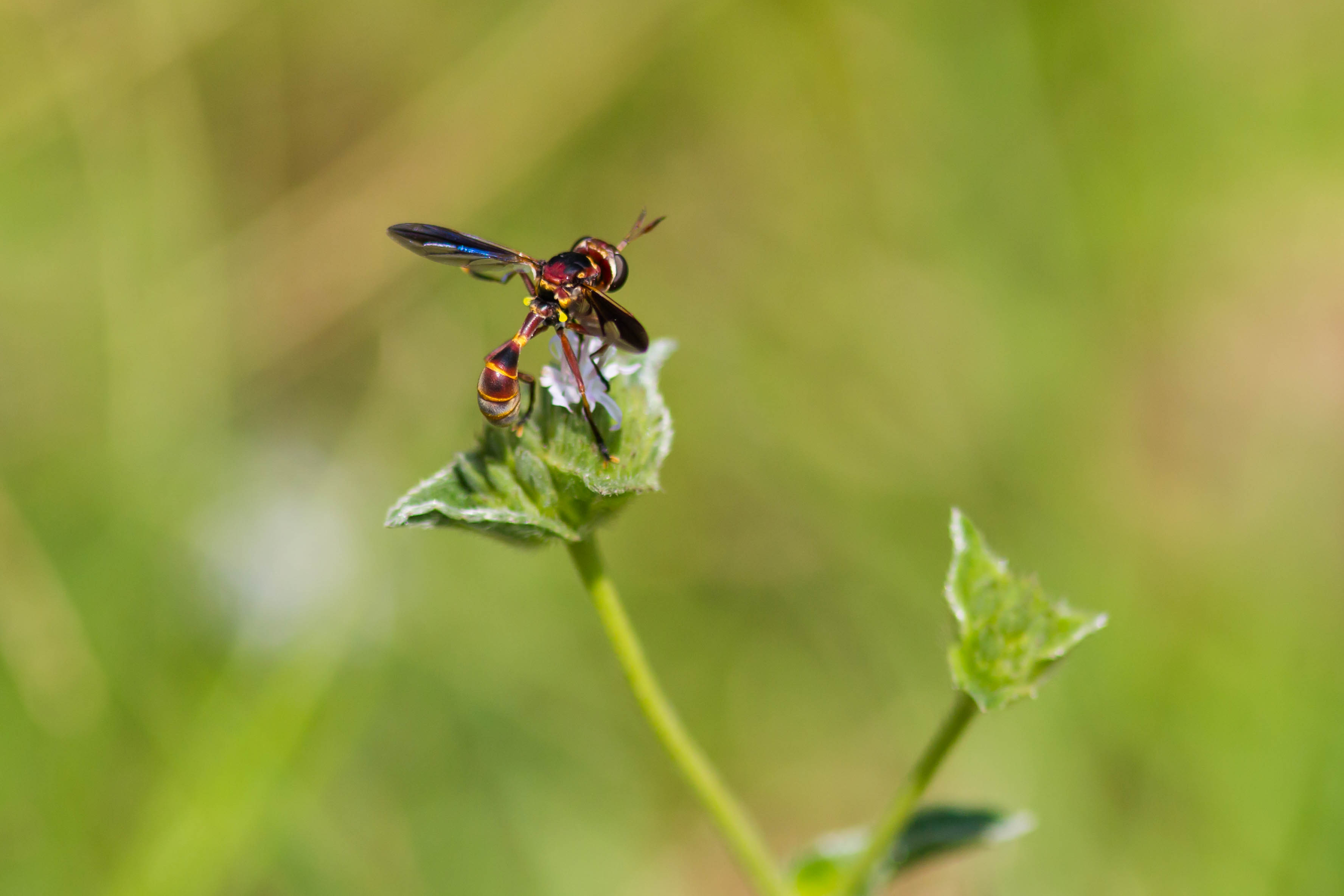
- Physoconops excisus

Scientific classification
- Domain: Eukaryota
- Kingdom: Animalia
- Phylum: Arthropoda
- Class: Insecta
- Order: Diptera
- Family: Conopidae
- Genus: Physoconops
- Species: P. excisus

Binomial name
- Physoconops excisus (Wiedemann, 1830)

Synonyms
- Conops excisus Wiedemann, 1830; Conops sugens Wiedemann, 1830

= Physoconops excisus =

Species of fly

Physoconops excisus is a species of thick-headed fly in the family Conopidae.
