= Physoconops townsendi =

Scientific classification
- Domain: Eukaryota
- Kingdom: Animalia
- Phylum: Arthropoda
- Class: Insecta
- Order: Diptera
- Family: Conopidae
- Genus: Physoconops
- Species: P. townsendi

Binomial name
- Physoconops townsendi Camras, 1955

Synonyms
- Conops auratus Townsend, 1901

Species of fly

Physoconops townsendi is a species of thick-headed fly in the family Conopidae.
