= Physoconops nigrimanus =

Scientific classification
- Domain: Eukaryota
- Kingdom: Animalia
- Phylum: Arthropoda
- Class: Insecta
- Order: Diptera
- Family: Conopidae
- Genus: Physoconops
- Species: P. nigrimanus

Binomial name
- Physoconops nigrimanus (Bigot, 1887)

Synonyms
- Conops limuva Brimley, 1927; Conops nigrimanus Bigot, 1887; Conops striatifrons Krober, 1915

Species of fly

Physoconops nigrimanus is a species of thick-headed fly in the family Conopidae.
