= Dalmannia blaisdelli =

Scientific classification
- Domain: Eukaryota
- Kingdom: Animalia
- Phylum: Arthropoda
- Class: Insecta
- Order: Diptera
- Family: Conopidae
- Genus: Dalmannia
- Species: D. blaisdelli

Binomial name
- Dalmannia blaisdelli Cresson, 1919

Species of fly

Dalmannia blaisdelli is a species of thick-headed flies in the family Conopidae.
