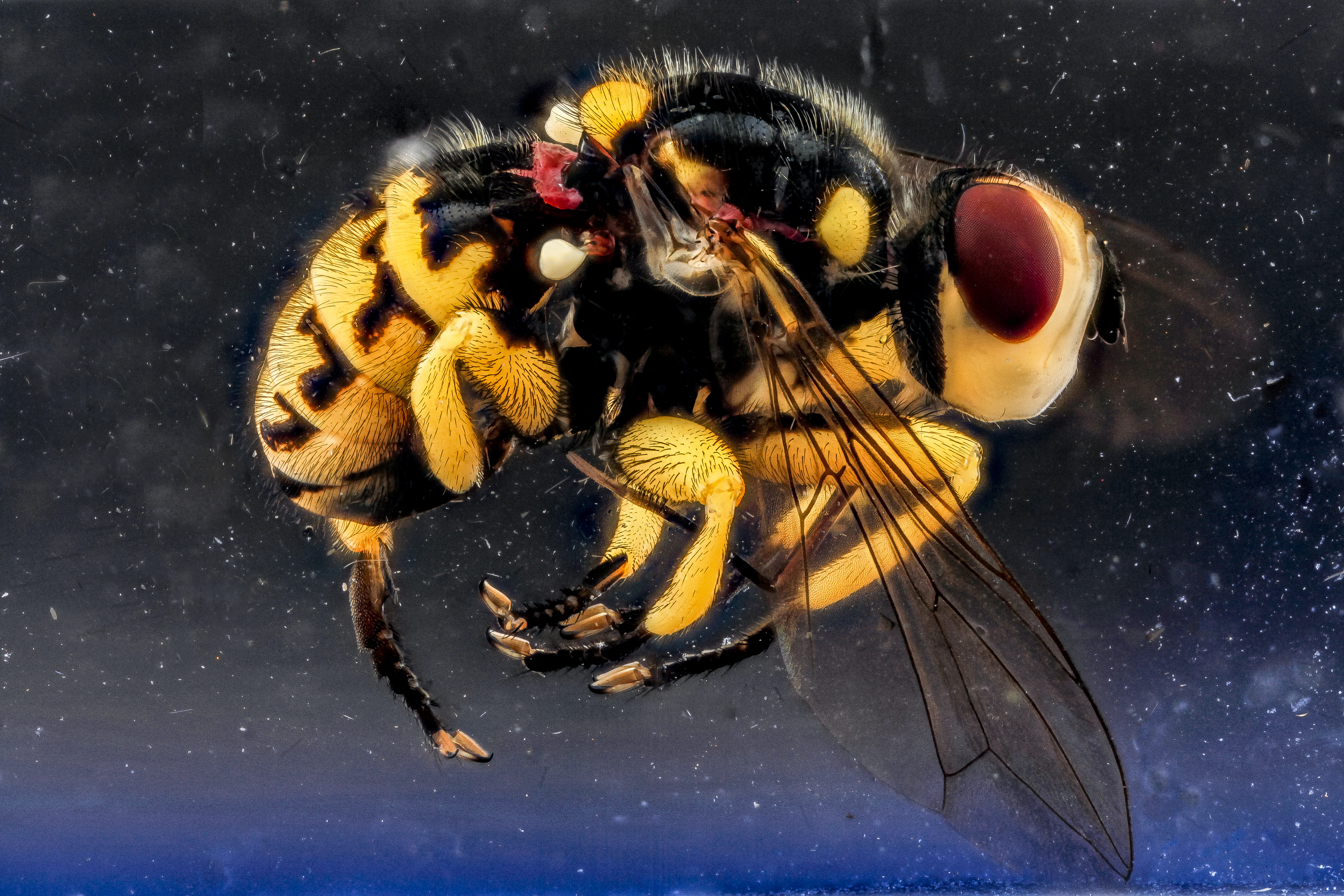

Scientific classification
- Domain: Eukaryota
- Kingdom: Animalia
- Phylum: Arthropoda
- Class: Insecta
- Order: Diptera
- Family: Conopidae
- Genus: Dalmannia
- Species: D. pacifica

Binomial name
- Dalmannia pacifica Banks, 1916

= Dalmannia pacifica =

Species of fly

Dalmannia pacifica is a species of thick-headed flies in the family Conopidae.
