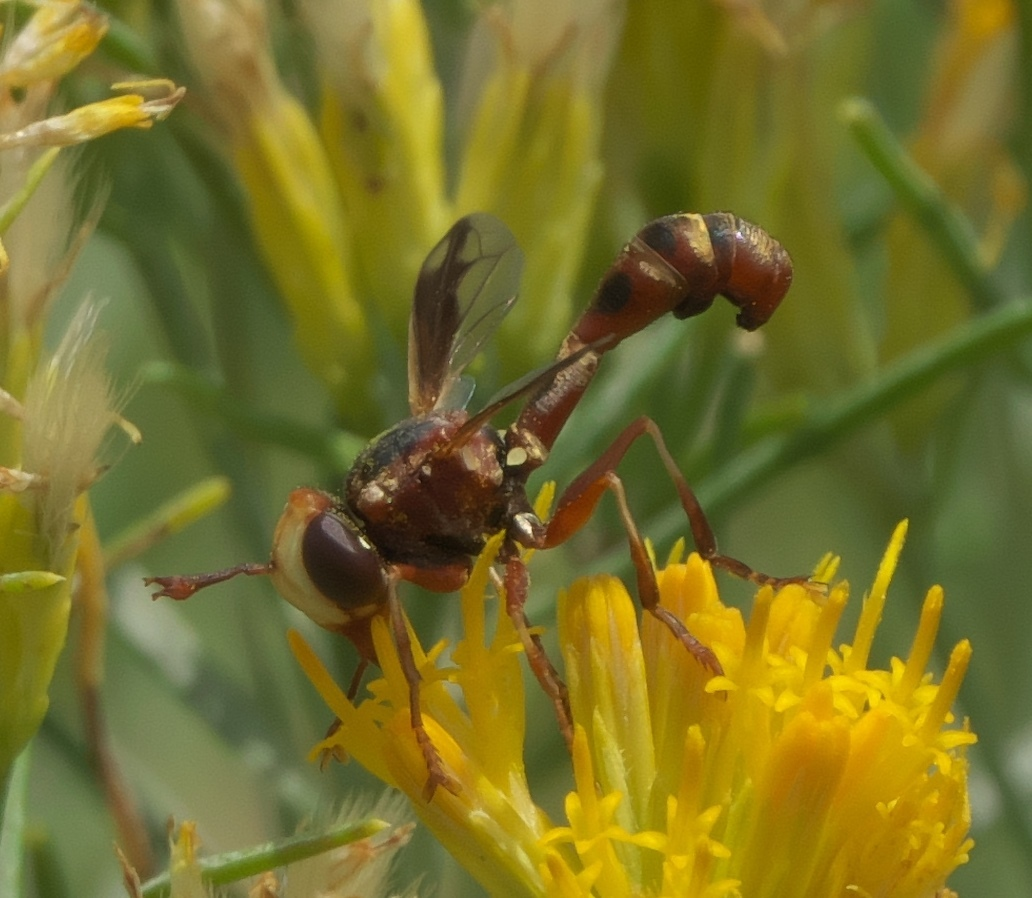
- Physocephala texana, Colorado

Scientific classification
- Domain: Eukaryota
- Kingdom: Animalia
- Phylum: Arthropoda
- Class: Insecta
- Order: Diptera
- Family: Conopidae
- Genus: Physocephala
- Species: P. texana

Binomial name
- Physocephala texana (Williston, 1882)

Synonyms
- Conops affinis Williston, 1882; Conops ochreiceps Bigot, 1887; Conops texana Williston, 1882; Physocephala buccalis Van Duzee, 1927; Physocephala humeralis Van Duzee, 1927; Physocephala rubida Van Duzee, 1934; Physocephala simulans Van Duzee, 1927

= Physocephala texana =

Species of fly

Physocephala texana is a species of thick-headed fly in the family Conopidae. It is a parasite of Bombus vosnesenskii.
