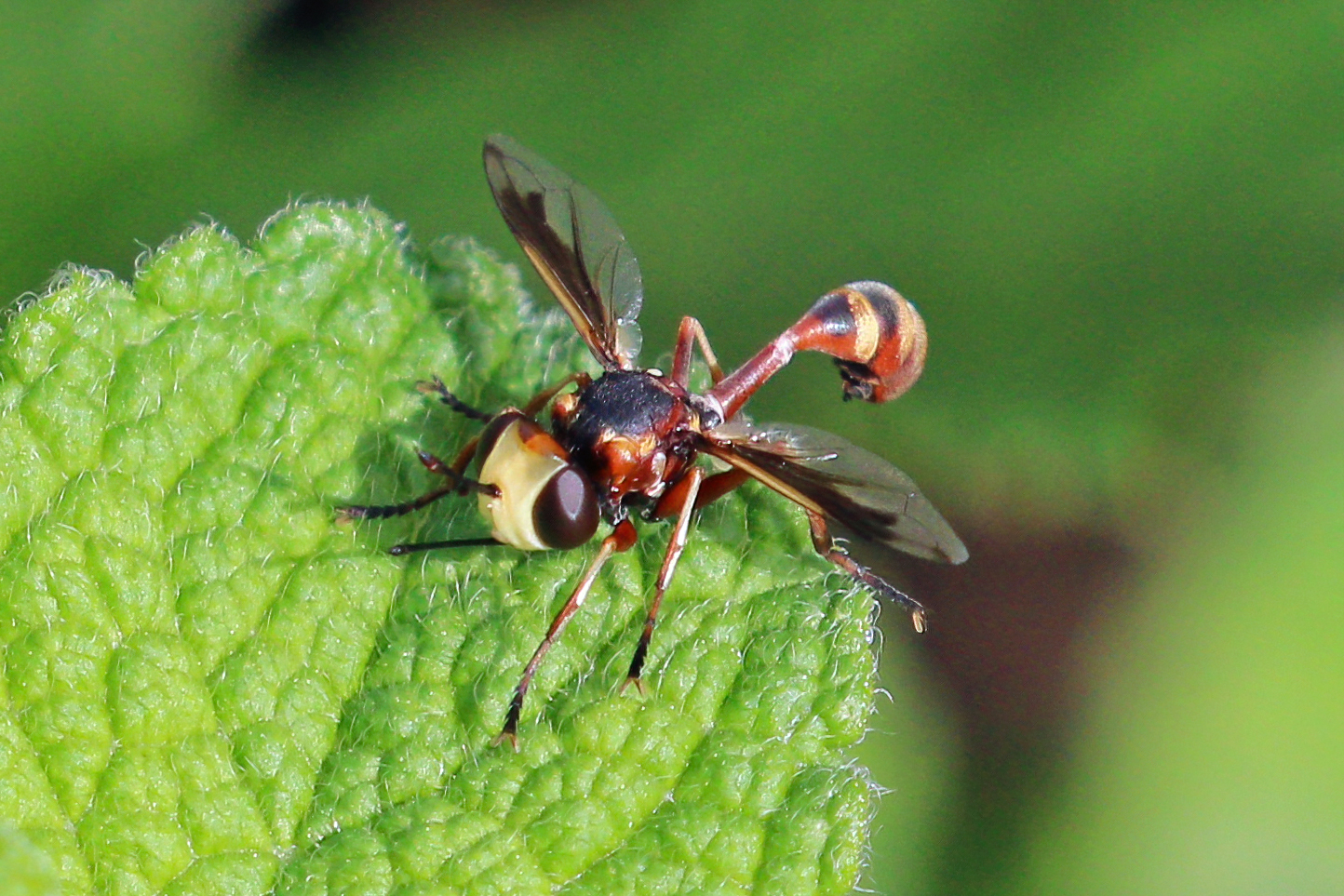
- Physocephala vittata

Scientific classification
- Kingdom: Animalia
- Phylum: Arthropoda
- Clade: Pancrustacea
- Class: Insecta
- Order: Diptera
- Family: Conopidae
- Subfamily: Conopinae
- Tribe: Physocephalini
- Genus: Physocephala; Schiner, 1861

Species
- See text

= Physocephala =

Genus of flies

Physocephala is a genus of flies from the family Conopidae.

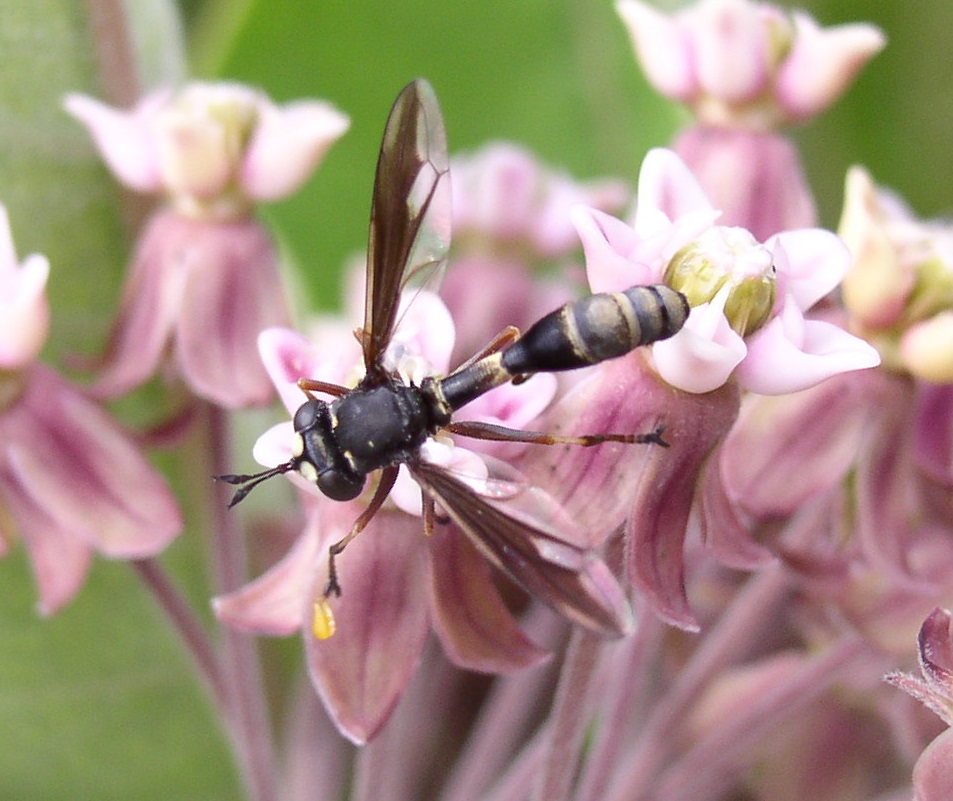
Physocephala furcillata, male, with pollinia on front leg

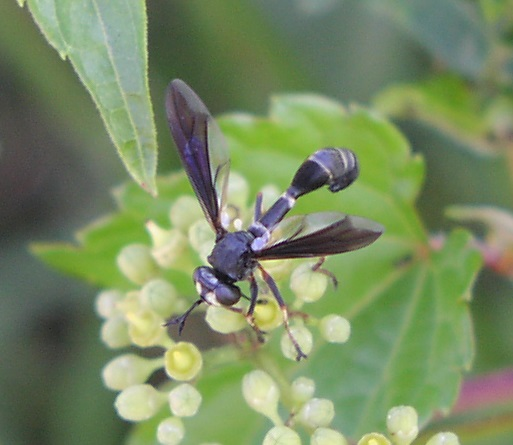
Physocephala tibialis, female

== Species ==
- Physocephala antiqua (Wiedemann, 1830)
- Physocephala bennetti Camras, 1996
- Physocephala biguttata von Röder, 1883
- Physocephala bipunctata (Macquart, 1843)
- Physocephala burgessi (Williston, 1882)
- Physocephala cayensis (Macquart, 1843)
- Physocephala chrysorrhoea (Meigen, 1824)
- Physocephala curticornis Kröber, 1915
- Physocephala floridana Camras, 1957
- Physocephala furcillata (Williston, 1882)
- Physocephala inhabilis (Walker, 1849)
- Physocephala lacera (Meigen, 1824)
- Physocephala laeta Becker, 1913
- Physocephala laticincta (Brullé, 1832)
- Physocephala marginata (Say, 1823)
- Physocephala nervosa Krober, 1915
- Physocephala nigra (De Geer, 1776)
- Physocephala pusilla (Meigen, 1824)
- Physocephala rufipes (Fabricius, 1781)
- Physocephala rufithorax Kröber, 1915
- Physocephala sagittaria (Say, 1823)
- Physocephala soror Kröber, 1915
- Physocephala spheniformis Camras, 1957
- Physocephala texana (Williston, 1882)
- Physocephala tibialis (Say, 1829)
- Physocephala truncata (Loew, 1847)
- Physocephala vaginalis (Rondani, 1865)
- Physocephala variegata (Meigen, 1824)
- Physocephala vittata (Fabricius, 1794)
- Physocephala wulpi Camras, 1996
