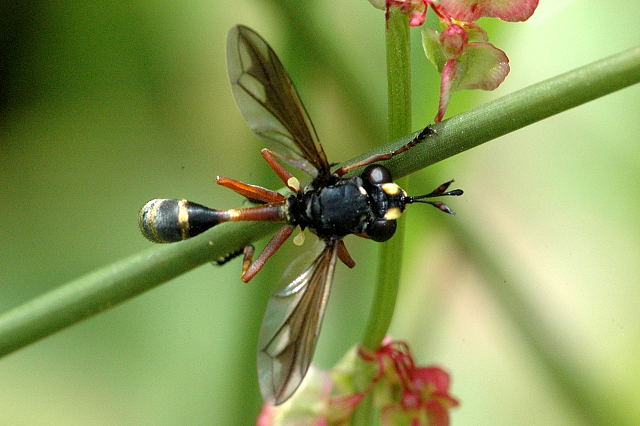

Scientific classification
- Kingdom: Animalia
- Phylum: Arthropoda
- Clade: Pancrustacea
- Class: Insecta
- Order: Diptera
- Family: Conopidae
- Genus: Physocephala
- Species: P. rufipes

Binomial name
- Physocephala rufipes (Fabricius, 1781)

Synonyms
- Conops petiolata Linnaeus, 1767; Conops rufipes Fabricius, 1781; Physocephala petiolata (Linnaeus, 1767)

= Physocephala rufipes =

Species of fly

Physocephala rufipes is a species of fly in the genus Physocephala in the family Conopidae.Their larvae are endoparasites of bumble bees of the genus Bombus. It is common throughout much of Europe.
