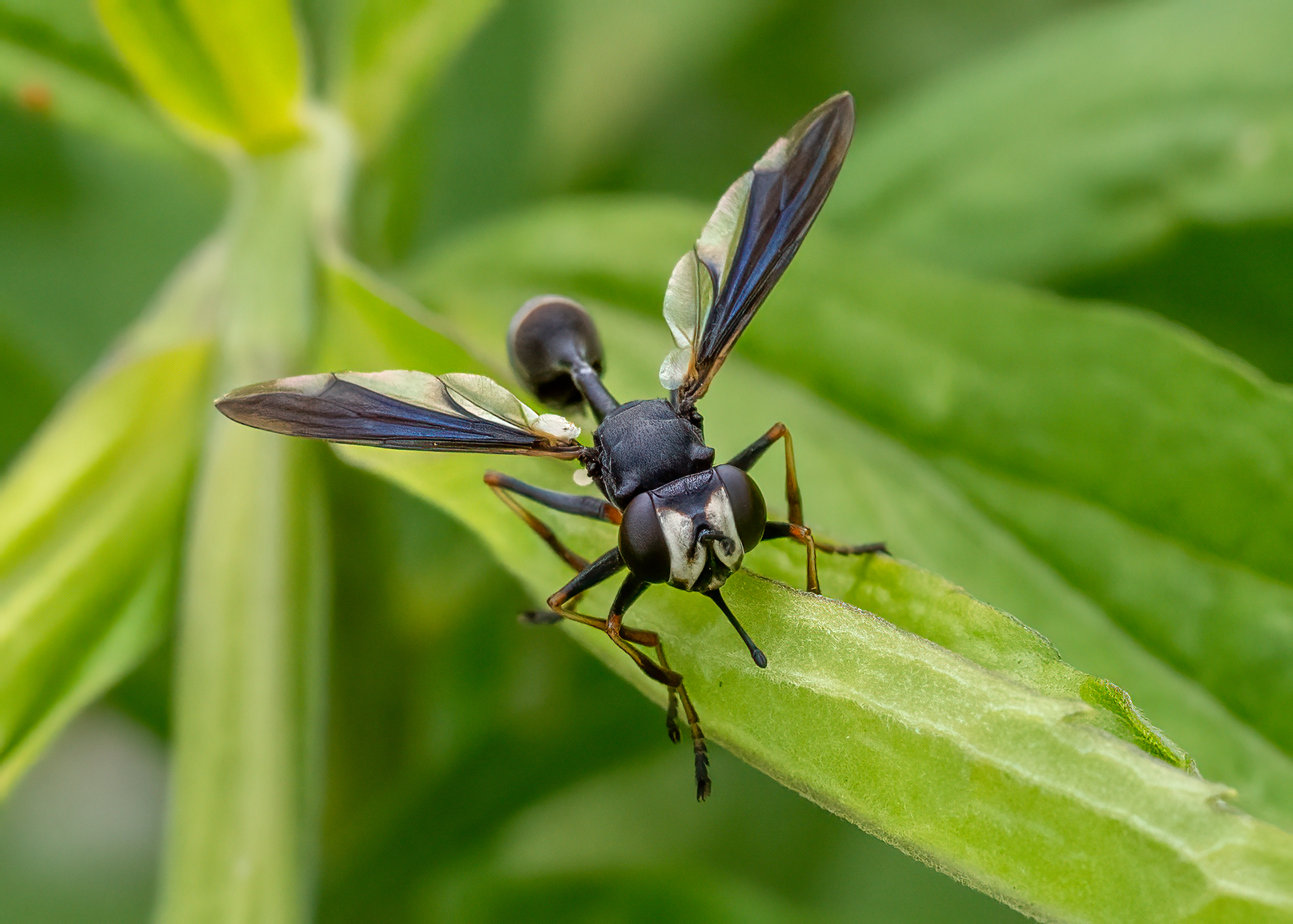

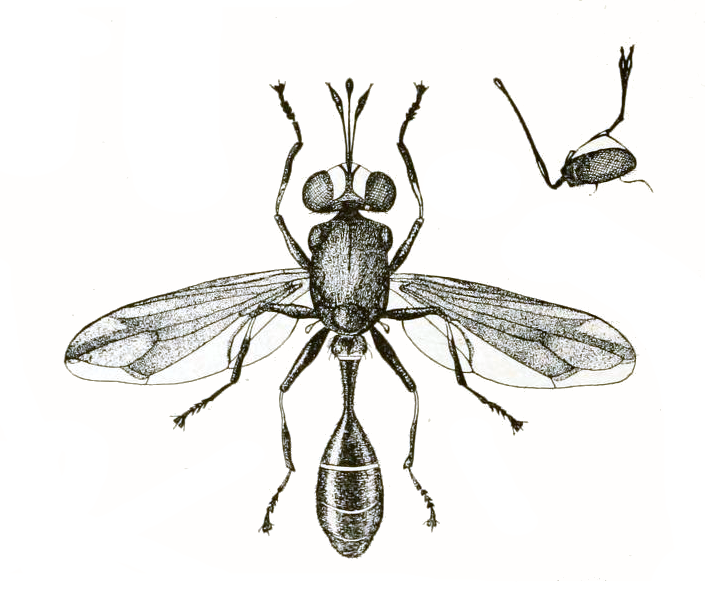

Scientific classification
- Kingdom: Animalia
- Phylum: Arthropoda
- Clade: Pancrustacea
- Class: Insecta
- Order: Diptera
- Family: Conopidae
- Genus: Physocephala
- Species: P. tibialis

Binomial name
- Physocephala tibialis (Say, 1829)

= Physocephala tibialis =

Species of fly

Physocephala tibialis, the common eastern physocephala, is a species of thick-headed fly (family Conopidae) found throughout the eastern United States, often near flowering plants. The adult fly is primarily black with a yellow face and thin white stripes on the abdomen. It is commonly found along the east coast of the United States and is often found near flowering plants.

P. tibialis flies parasitize many different species of bees by laying their eggs inside the abdomen of their host. The larva hatches inside of the host and grows and develops until it takes up the majority of the host's abdomen. The host then dies and the larva envelopes itself in a puparium and pupates inside of the corpse. After an extended period of pupation, the adult emerges from the corpse of the host bee. When a bee becomes parasitized by a P. tibialis larva, certain behaviors such as induced grave digging and changes in flower preference often occur.

== Geographic distribution ==
P. tibialis is found in North America, primarily along the east coast of the United States. They can be seen as far north as Massachusetts and as south as Florida. They have also been seen as far west as Wisconsin and Texas.

== Habitat ==
P. tibialis can often be found near flowering plants, likely due to the presence of host species pollinating nearby plants. They have not been seen to prefer specific species of plants, and attack host species at a variety of different flowering plants.

== Physical description ==
=== Larva/pupa ===
The larva is white and swollen when it hatches from the egg and molts three times until it reaches its fully grown size of around 30–60 mm in length.

The pupa is sclerotized and brown in color. It is long and ovular in shape, and around 30–50 mm in length.

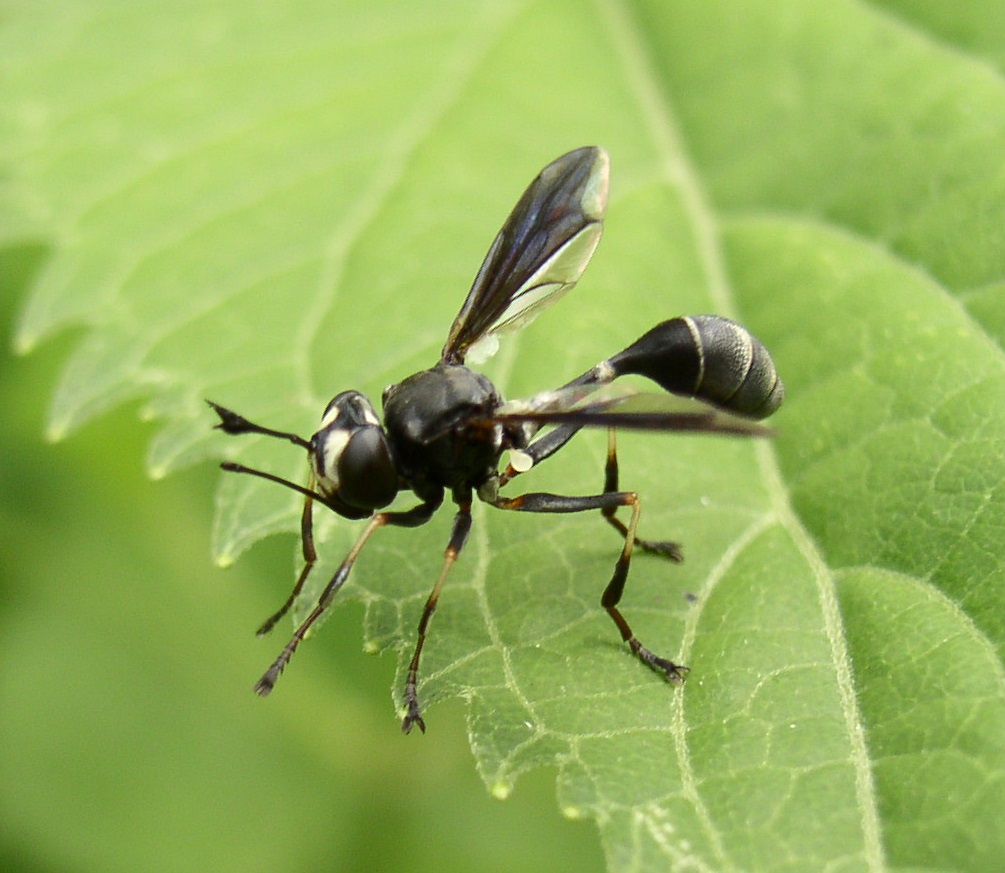
Physocephala tibialis male

=== Adult ===
The adult P. tibialis is characterized by an almost entirely black abdomen and pale tarsal segments on the legs. Thin stripes of white are visible on the abdominal segments. The wings of P. tibialis are brown in color with the brown emanating from a completely dark colored discal cell to outside the limits of the great cross vein. The lateral areas of the head are light yellow, and the segment connecting each half of the face is black. The cheeks of P. tibialis are black with no speckling. Flies from the family Conopidae have thick ptilina, sacks on the head that can be inflated to break through the puparium wall. The ptilinum of P. tibialis contains numerous sclerotised scales, which help with eclosion from the host and digging behavior.

== Life cycle ==
The growth and development of P. tibialis is fairly unique in that a single egg is laid inside of a Hymenopteran host. After hatching, the larva parasitizes the nutrients of the host in order to grow and develop through three instar stages. The host eventually dies and the larva then pupates inside of the corpse until its emergence as an adult fly.

=== Larval stage ===
P. tibialis flies, along with a few other Conopidae species, lay their eggs inside bees and wasps (order: Hymenoptera). The larva has a white and bulging appearance right after it emerges from the egg around one to two days after it is laid. It uses its pointed, extendable mouth to rupture the egg. The larva then goes through 3 instar stages, molting between each stage. During the first two instar stages, the larva feeds on the hemolymph of the host. In the third instar stage, the larva primarily feeds on the intestinal tissue of the host. The first and second instar phases last between two and three days each, and the third instar phase lasts around four to five days. This entire development period of about 10–12 days takes place within the abdomen of the host. The larva is around 30–60 mm long when fully grown.

=== Pupal stage ===
Once the larva has reached near full development, the host dies, and the larva then encapsulates itself in a puparium within the host corpse. The pupa is around 30–50 mm in length, brown in color, and has a prolonged ovular shape. This life stage is often referred to as overwintering because the pupal period takes place for an extended period of time (154–190 days), generally throughout the colder months of the year.

== Food resources ==
=== Larvae ===
P. tibialis remains enclosed in its Hymenopteran host for the entire larval stage of development. During the first and second instar stages, the larva primarily consumes the hemolymph of the host for nutrients. During the third instar stage, the larva begins to consume the intestinal tissue of the host.

== Parental Care ==
=== Oviposition ===
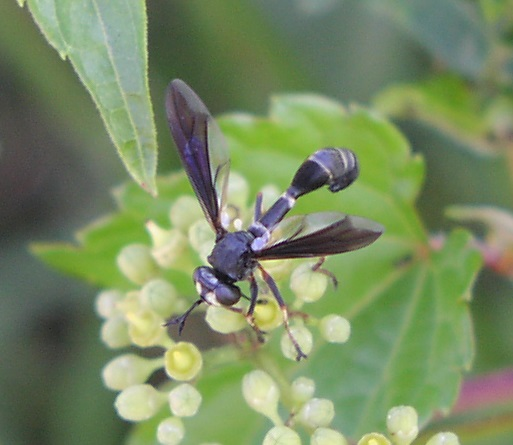
Physocephala tibialis female

P. tibialis females can often be found near the base of flowering plants anticipating the arrival of host species. The females attack hosts during foraging periods and insert an egg into their abdomen. The female penetrates an intersegmental membrane on the host in order to gain access to the abdominal cavity.

== Parasitic behaviors ==
=== Induced grave digging in host ===
When a Hymenopteran is infected with P. tibialis, the bee/wasp will often bury itself in the soil before dying. This offers no benefit for the host as it is close to nearly inevitable death. P. tibialis adaptively manipulates this behavior in the Hymenopteran in order to benefit itself, allowing the P. tibialis larva to be isolated from predators as well as protect themselves from environmental factors. However, the mechanism of this manipulation is currently unknown. Flies who emerged from underground were on average larger, heavier, and less likely to have non-functional or malformed wings than flies who emerged at ground level. P. tibialis larvae have different likelihoods of inducing self-burial behavior depending on the species of the Hymenopteran host.

=== Host response to parasite ===
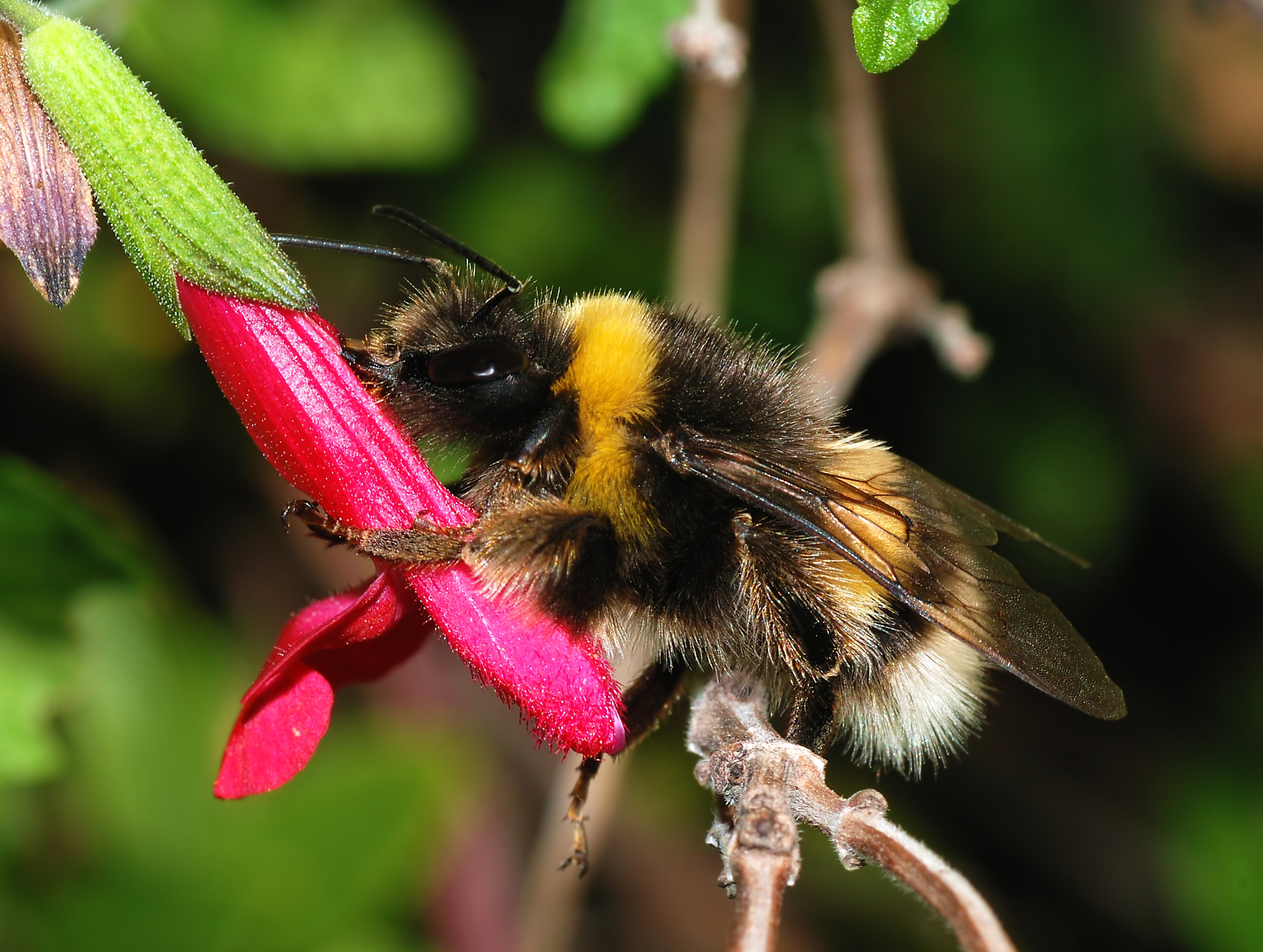
Bumblebee, a possible host species

Different species of bee respond differently to being infected by P.tibialis. Almost 70% of common eastern bumblebees respond to the infection by digging their own grave, while only 18% of brown-belted bumblebees respond in the same manner. Host insects possess defenses that prevent P. tibialis from implanting them with eggs. If this defense fails, their immune system can sometimes destroy the developing larvae. These species-dependent defense mechanisms forces the parasite P. tibialis to become specific in its target host.

=== Flower choice alterations in host ===
Bumblebee hosts often choose to pollinate different selections of flower species after being parasitized by P. tibialis. In one study, it was found that parasitized hosts often pollinated flowers other than those from dominant species in the area. Parasitized bees were also seen to be more sporadic in their flower choices. The mechanism and rationale behind this change in flower choice is currently undetermined.

=== Eclosion ===
After the pupal stage of the fly is complete, the adult first uses its mouthparts and ptilinum to rupture the puparium. Then the fly fully inflates its ptilinum until it is around the same size as its head and ecloses from the corpse of its Hymenopteran host. The large size of the ptilinum as well as the sclerotized scales help to rupture the exoskeleton of the corpse. The fly then rhythmically inflates and deflates the ptilinum to continue maneuvering its way out, using its mouthparts and legs as leverage to pry itself from the corpse. Because of the induced grave digging behavior in the Hymenopteran hosts, the newly emerged fly also uses its ptilinum, mouthparts, and legs to dig up to ground level.
