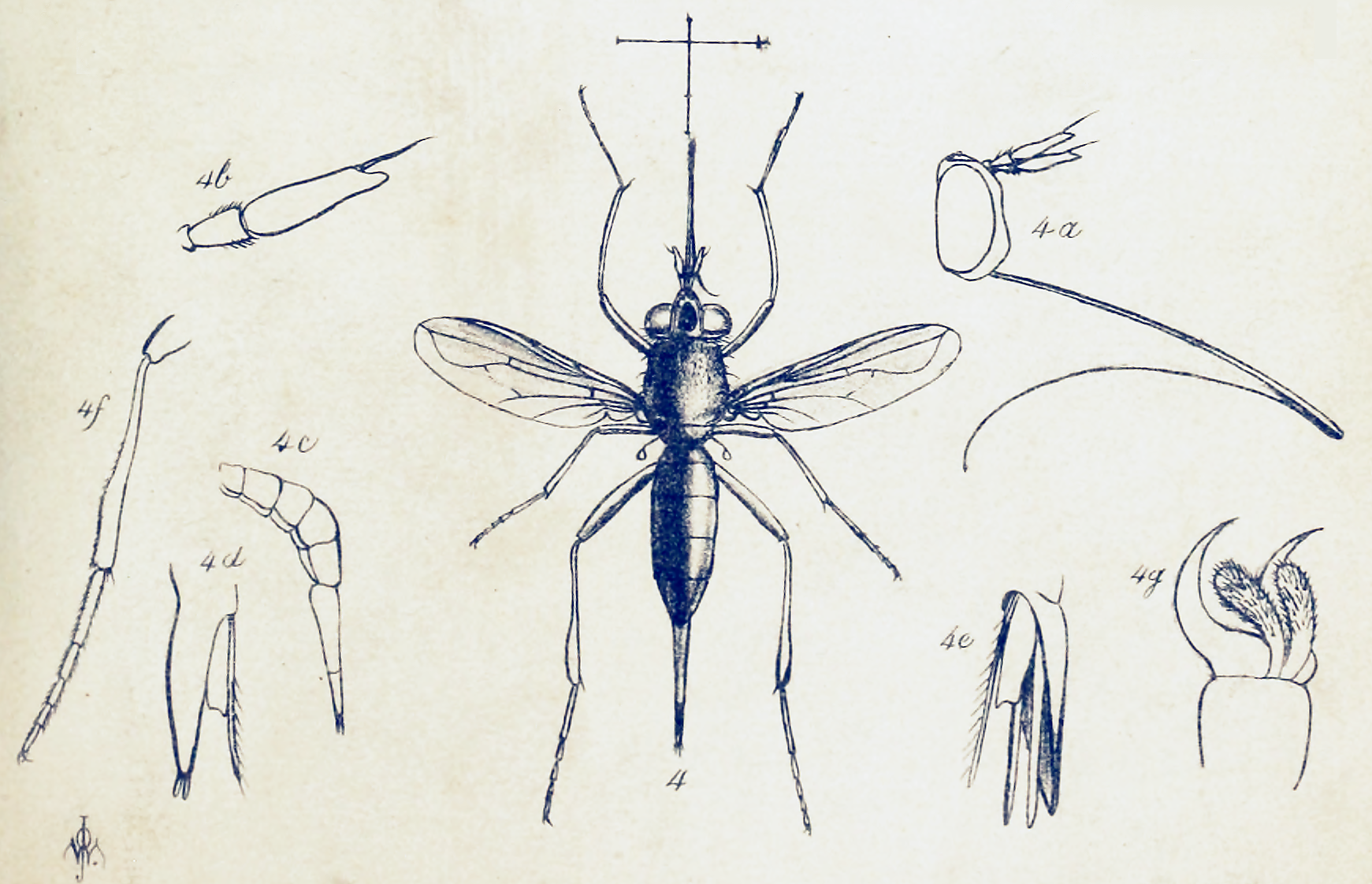
- Stylogaster leonum

Scientific classification
- Domain: Eukaryota
- Kingdom: Animalia
- Phylum: Arthropoda
- Class: Insecta
- Order: Diptera
- Family: Conopidae
- Subfamily: Stylogastrinae
- Genus: Stylogaster; Macquart, 1835

Species
- Many

= Stylogaster =

Genus of flies

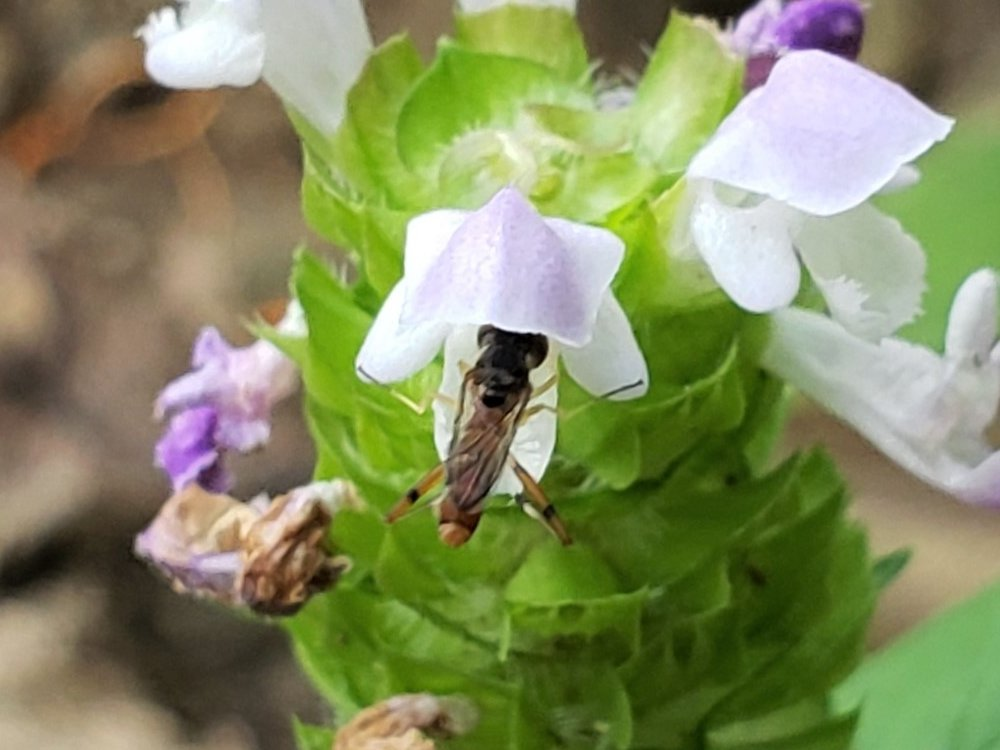
Stylogaster species obtaining nectar from a self-heal flower

The conopid genus Stylogaster is a group of unusual flies. It is the only genus in the subfamily Stylogastrinae, which some authorities have historically treated as a separate family Stylogastridae (or Stylogasteridae).

== Biology ==
Stylogastrines are obligate associates of cockroaches, Orthoptera, some Diptera and ants.

These flies typically use army ants' raiding columns to flush out their prey, ground-dwelling Orthoptera and/or roaches. Stylogastrines are somewhat atypical for conopids, in that the egg itself is shaped somewhat like a harpoon, with a rigid barbed tip, and the egg is forcibly jabbed into the host. The female of some species waits for army ants to flush out a target, then she dives in and jabs an egg into the host. The Stylogaster larvae then develop as endoparasitoids. This is a remarkably high-risk behavior, in that many hosts are captured and killed by the ants after a female has laid an egg in it, so many eggs are lost.

Adults can occasionally be found at flowers, feeding on nectar with their proboscis, which is longer than the body when unfolded. The female's abdomen is also folded under the body, and is the derivation of the generic name (Stylogaster = "needle-tail").

== Distribution ==
Stylogastrines can be found from the Neotropics to Canada, South America, Africa south of the Sahara, and parts of Southern Asia, including the Philippines and New Guinea.

== Selected species ==
- Stylogaster biannulata (Say, 1823)
- Stylogaster camrasi Stuckenberg, 1963
- Stylogaster ctenitarsa Camras & Parrillo, 1996
- Stylogaster malgachensis Camras, 1962
- Stylogaster neglecta Williston, 1883
- Stylogaster pauliani Curran, 1962
- Stylogaster rafaeli Camras & Parrillo, 1996
- Stylogaster seguyi Camras, 1962
- Stylogaster seyrigi Séguy, 1932
- Stylogaster sinaloae Camras, 1989
- Stylogaster smithiana Lopes, 1971
- Stylogaster souzai Monteiro, 1960
- Stylogaster souzalopesi Camras, 1990
