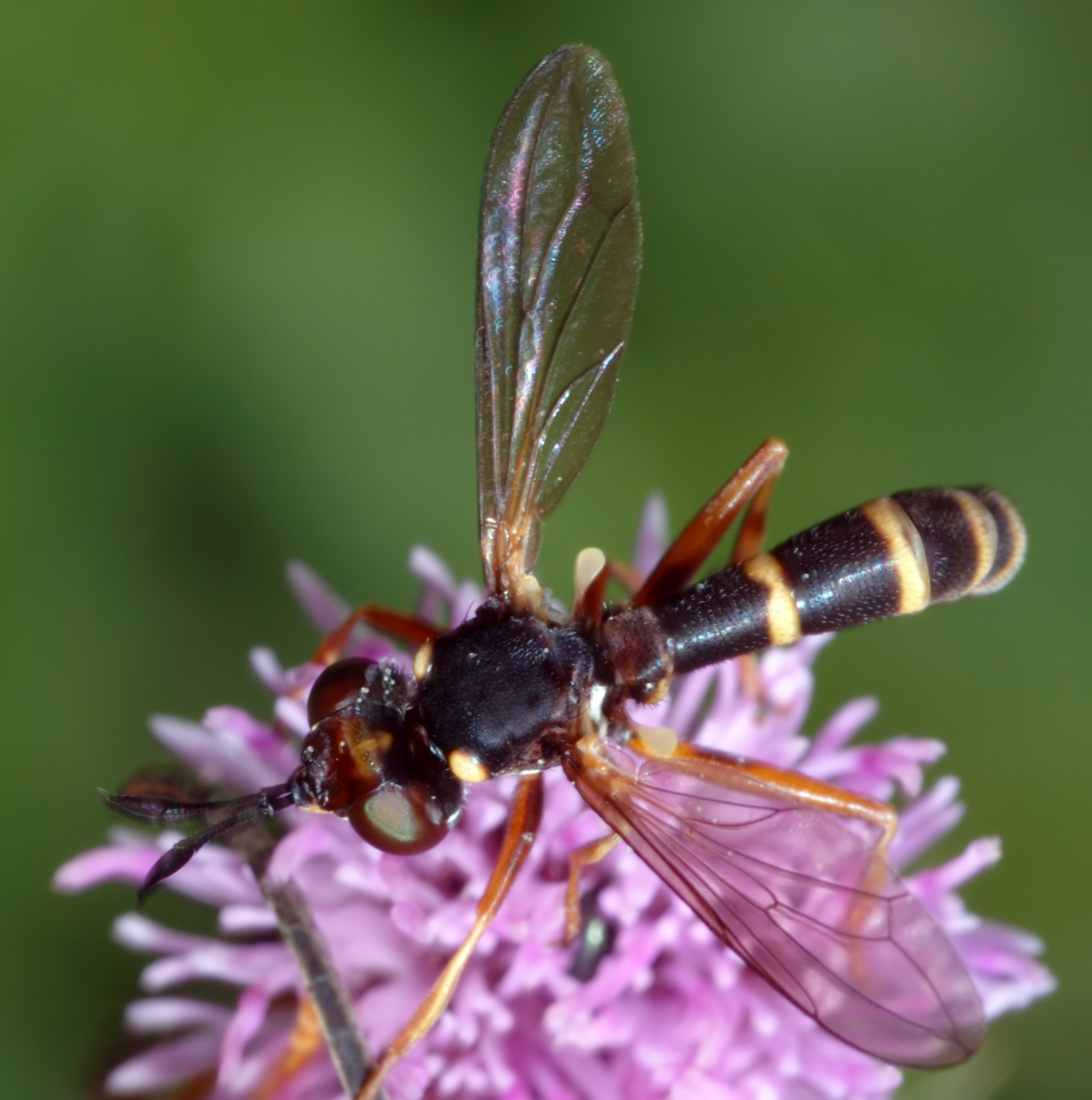
- Conops quadrifasciatus

Scientific classification
- Kingdom: Animalia
- Phylum: Arthropoda
- Clade: Pancrustacea
- Class: Insecta
- Order: Diptera
- Family: Conopidae
- Subfamily: Conopinae

Tribes
- See text

= Conopinae =

Subfamily of flies

Conopinae is a subfamily of flies from the family Conopidae.

== Tribes ==
- Tribe Conopini
  - Genus Conops Linnaeus, 1758
  - Genus Leopoldius Rondani, 1843
- Tribe Physocephalini
  - Genus Physocephala Schiner, 1861
  - Genus Physoconops Szilady, 1926
