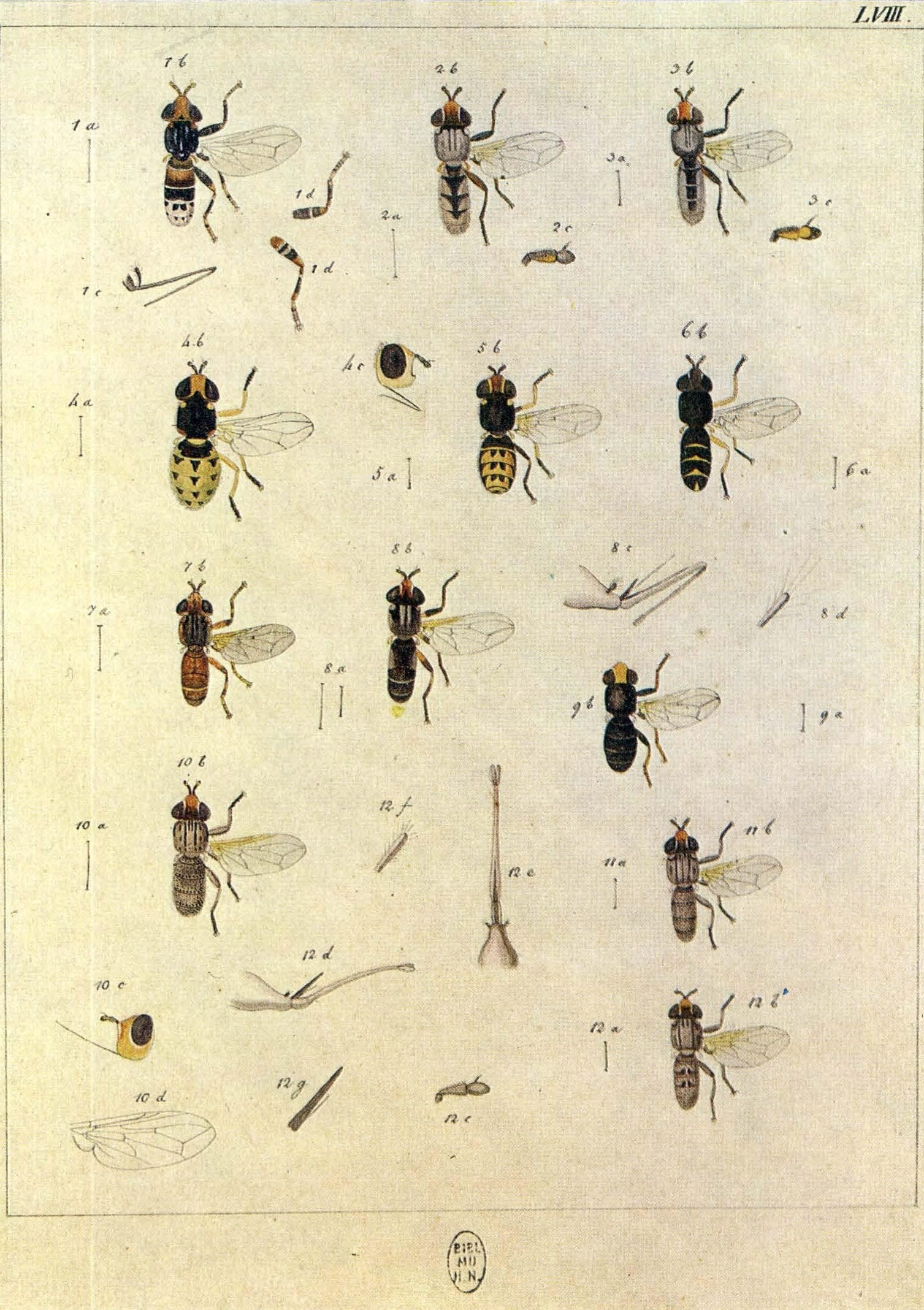
- Illustration in Johann Wilhelm Meigen Europäischen Zweiflügeligen Figures 4, 5

Scientific classification
- Kingdom: Animalia
- Phylum: Arthropoda
- Clade: Pancrustacea
- Class: Insecta
- Order: Diptera
- Family: Conopidae
- Subfamily: Dalmanniinae
- Genus: Dalmannia; Robineau-Desvoidy, 1830

Species
- See text

= Dalmannia =

Genus of flies

Dalmannia is a genus of flies from the family Conopidae.

== Species ==
- Dalmannia aculeata (Linnaeus, 1758, 1761)
- Dalmannia blaisdelli Cresson, 1919
- Dalmannia confusa Becker, 1923
- Dalmannia dorsalis (Fabricius, 1794)
- Dalmannia heterotricha Bohart, 1938
- Dalmannia marginata (Meigen, 1824)
- Dalmannia nigriceps Loew, 1866
- Dalmannia pacifica Banks, 1916
- Dalmannia picta Williston, 1883
- Dalmannia punctata (Fabricius, 1794)
- Dalmannia vitiosa Coquillett, 1892
