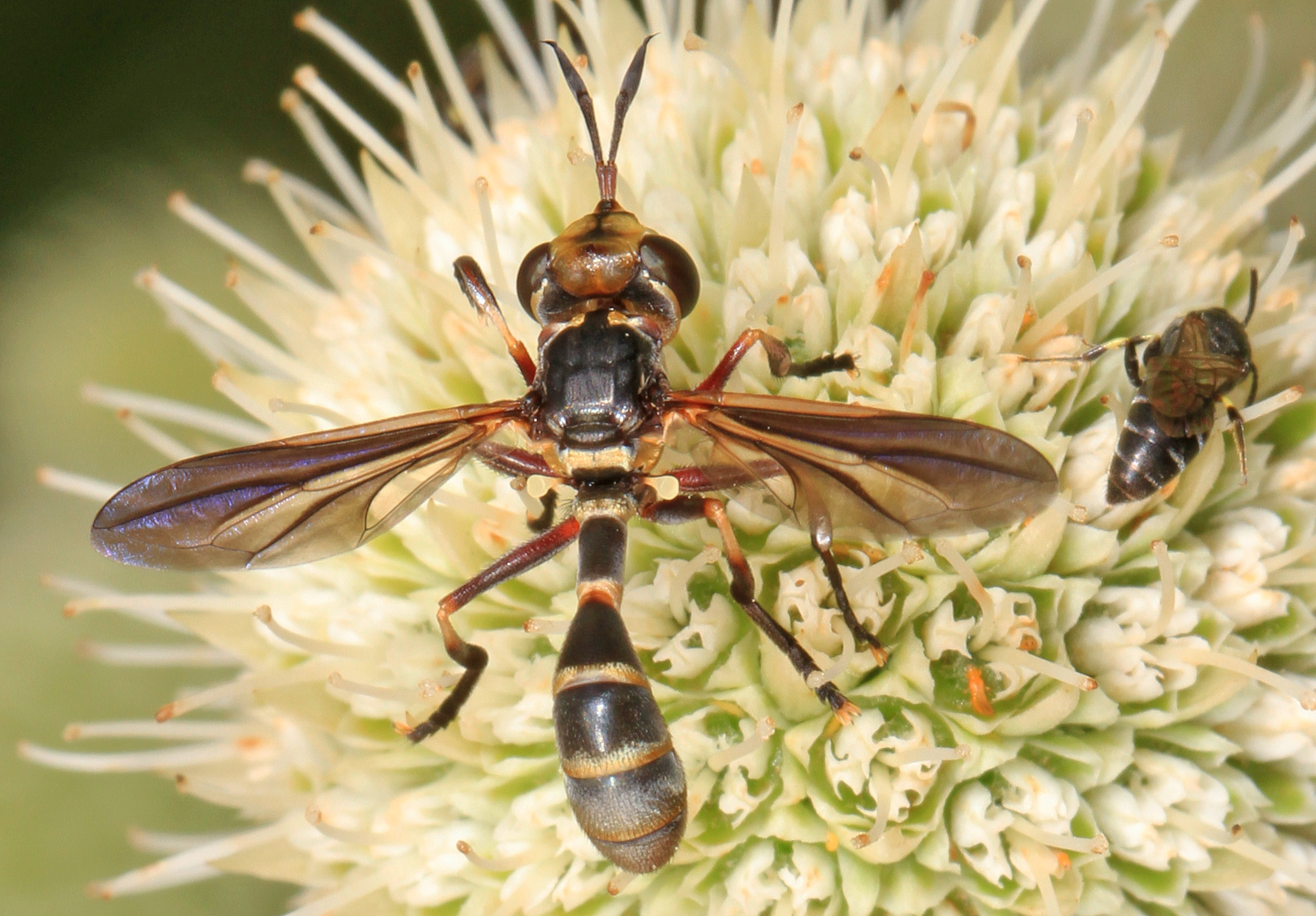

Scientific classification
- Domain: Eukaryota
- Kingdom: Animalia
- Phylum: Arthropoda
- Class: Insecta
- Order: Diptera
- Family: Conopidae
- Subfamily: Conopinae
- Tribe: Conopini
- Genus: Physoconops; Szilady, 1926

= Physoconops =

Genus of flies

Physoconops is a genus of thick-headed flies in the family Conopidae. There are about 13 described species in Physoconops.

== Species ==
- Physoconops analis (Fabricius, 1805)
- Physoconops brachyrhynchus (Macquart, 1843)
- Physoconops bulbirostris (Loew, 1853)
- Physoconops discalis (Williston, 1892)
- Physoconops excisus (Wiedemann, 1830)
- Physoconops floridanus Camras, 1955 (Florida physoconops)
- Physoconops fronto (Williston, 1885)
- Physoconops gracilis (Williston, 1885)
- Physoconops nigrimanus (Bigot, 1887)
- Physoconops obscuripennis (Williston, 1882)
- Physoconops sylvosus (Williston, 1882)
- Physoconops townsendi Camras, 1955
- Physoconops weemsi Camras, 2007
