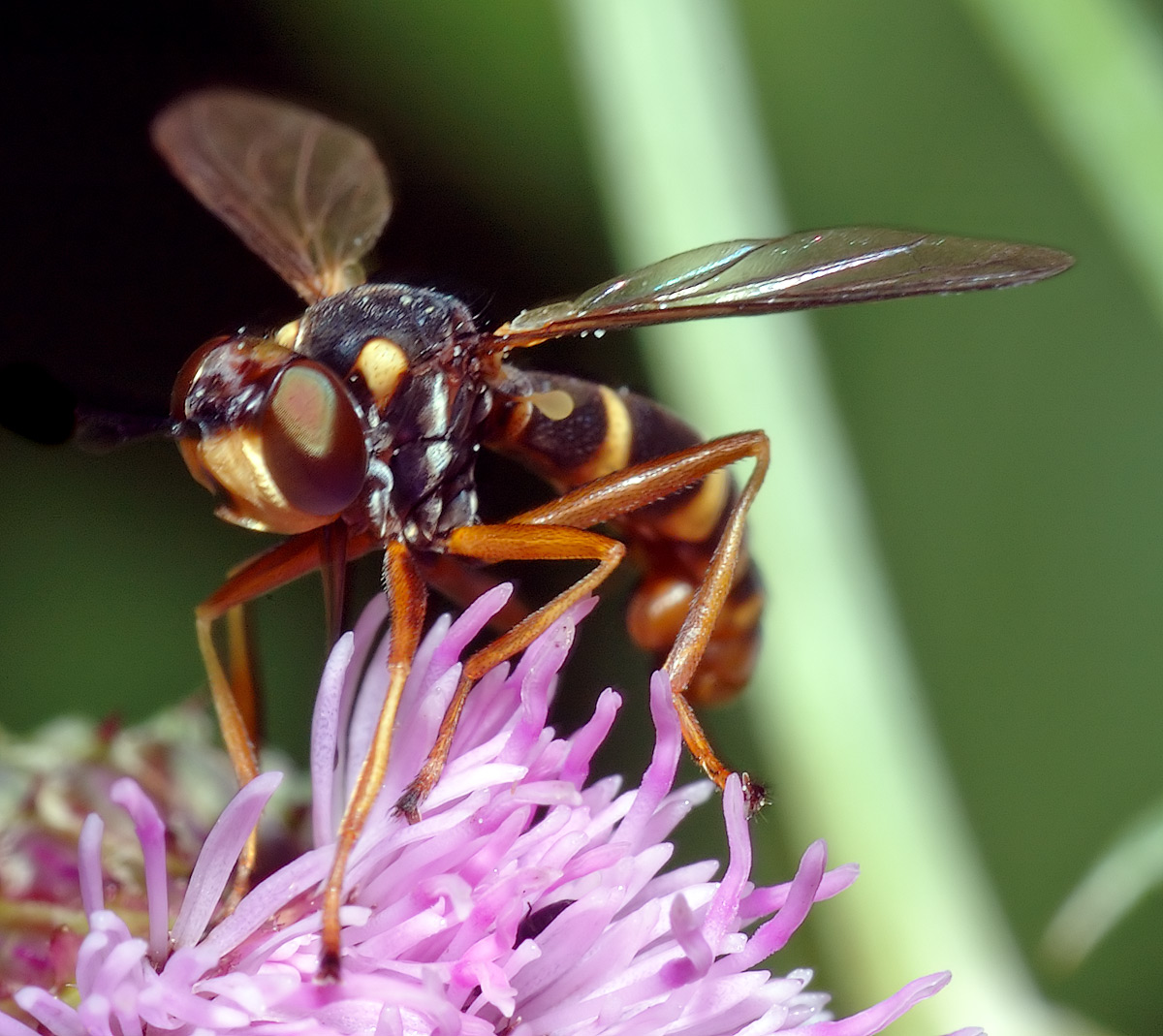
- Conops quadrifasciatus
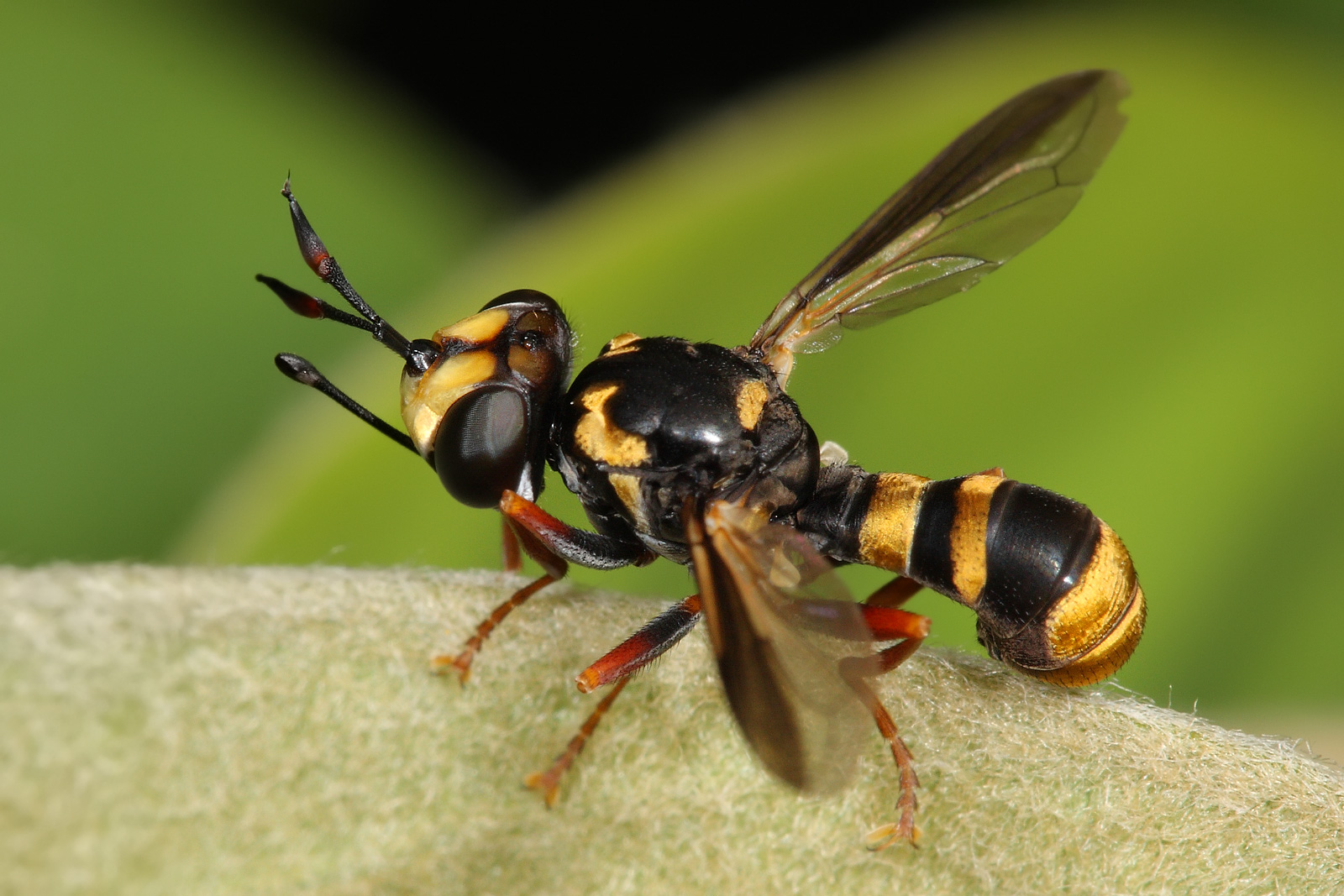
- Conopid wasp mimic

Scientific classification
- Kingdom: Animalia
- Phylum: Arthropoda
- Class: Insecta
- Order: Diptera
- Clade: Eremoneura
- (unranked): Cyclorrhapha
- Section: Schizophora
- Family: Conopidae; Latreille, 1802

Subfamilies
- Conopinae; Dalmanniinae; Myopinae; Notoconopinae; Stylogastrinae

= Conopidae =

Thick-headed flies

Family of flies

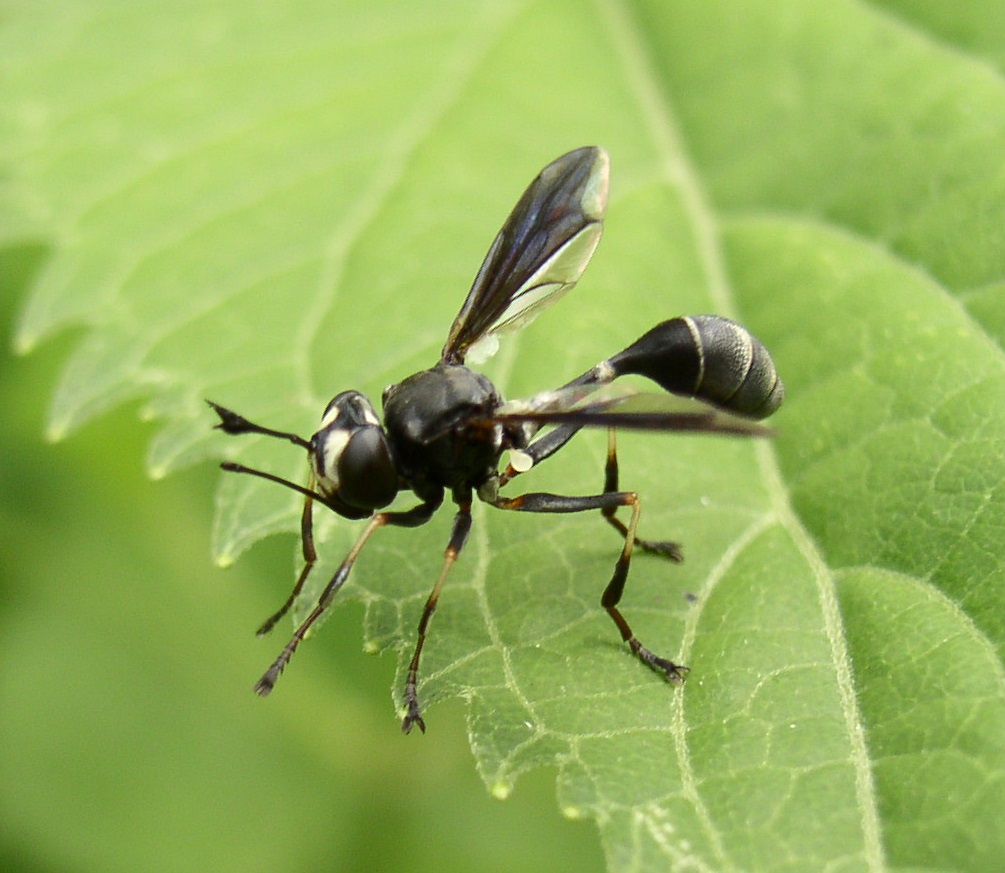
Physocephala tibialis male

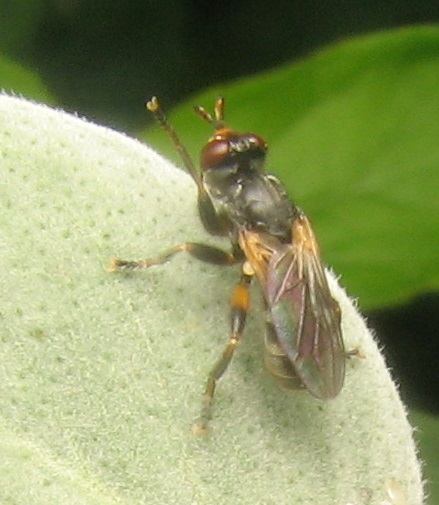
Thecophora

The Conopidae, also known as the thick-headed flies, are a family of flies within the Brachycera suborder of Diptera, and the sole member of the superfamily Conopoidea. Flies of the family Conopidae are distributed worldwide in all the biogeographic realms except for the poles and many of the Pacific islands. About 800 species in 47 genera are described worldwide, about 70 of which are found in North America. The majority of conopids are black and yellow, or black and white, and often strikingly resemble wasps, bees, or flies of the family Syrphidae, themselves notable bee mimics. A conopid is most frequently found at flowers, feeding on nectar with its proboscis, which is often long.

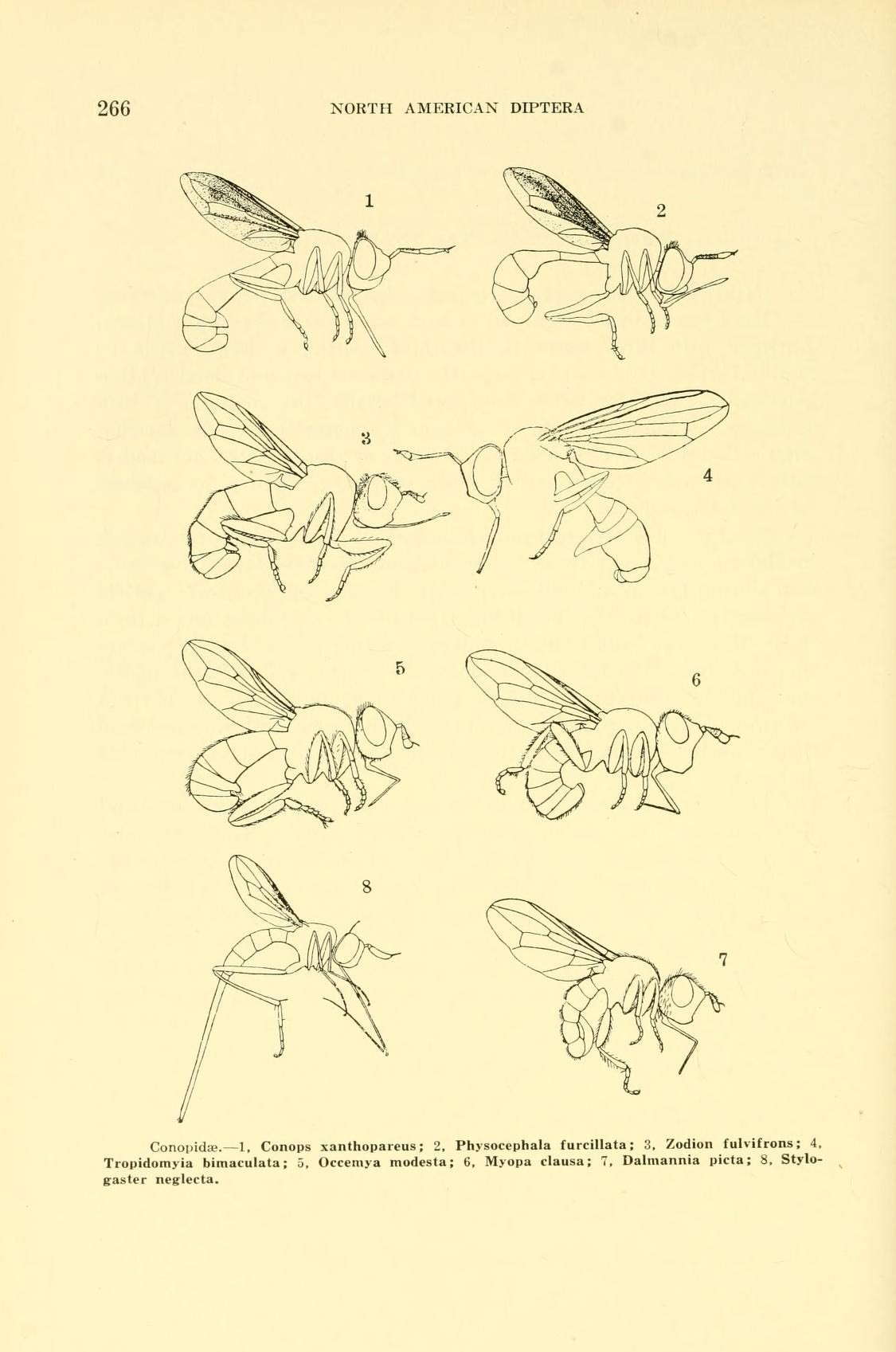
Conopidae morphology

== Description ==
For terms see Morphology of Diptera.

Rather thinly pilose or nearly bare, elongate or stout flies of small to large size (3–20 mm, usually 5–15 mm). They are often lustrous with a black and yellow colour pattern or with reddish brown markings. The head is broad and the frons is broad in both sexes. Ocelli may be present or absent (Conopinae). Ocellar bristles are small or absent. Interfrontal bristles and vibrissae are absent. The antennae have three segments, the third bearing a dorsal bare arista or terminal style. Above the antennae is an inflatable ptilinum. The oral opening is large and the proboscis is long and slender and often geniculate. The base of the abdomen is often constricted and the genitalia of both sexes are conspicuous. In the females the genitalia are often large or greatly elongated. The wing is usually clear, in some cases with dark markings often along the costa. The costa is continuous and the subcostal vein is complete. The anal cell is closed and the first basal cell is always very long, the second moderately long. The apical cell is closed or much narrowed. Tibiae are with (Myopinae) or without dorsal preapical bristle.

Sample genera: Conops, Dalmannia, Physocephala, Stylogaster, Myopa, and Physoconops.

== Biology ==
The larvae of all conopids are internal parasites, most of aculeate (stinging) Hymenoptera. Adult females aggressively intercept their hosts in flight to deposit eggs. Accordingly, in the species Bombus terrestris, it has been shown that vulnerable foraging bees are likely the most susceptible to parasitism by conopids. The female's abdomen is modified to form what amounts to a "can opener" to pry open the segments of the host's abdomen as the egg is inserted. The subfamily Stylogastrinae, including the genus Stylogaster, is somewhat different, in that the egg itself is shaped somewhat like a harpoon, with a rigid barbed tip, and the egg is forcibly jabbed into the host. Some species of Stylogaster are obligate associates of army ants, using the ants' raiding columns to flush out their prey. Certain members of the genus Physocephala have minor economic importance as parasites of honey bees. Some members of this genus, such as Physocephala tibialis have been shown to induce certain bumblebees to bury themselves before they die, allowing the adult fly to emerge from their hosts underground. More research is needed to determine the life histories of most conopids.

== Species lists ==
- Nearctic
- West Palaearctic including Russia
- Australasian/Oceanian
- Japan
- World list

== Identification ==
- Krober. 1925. Conopidae.In: Lindner, E. (Ed.). Die Fliegen der Paläarktischen Region, 4, 4: 1-41

Keys to Palaearctic species but now needs revision (in German).

- Séguy, E. (1934) Diptères: Brachycères. II. Muscidae acalypterae, Scatophagidae. Paris: Éditions Faune de France 28. virtuelle numérique
- Zirnjna. L.V. Family Conopidae in Bei-Bienko, G. Ya, 1988 Keys to the insects of the European Part of the USSR Volume 5 (Diptera) Part 2 English edition. Keys to Palaearctic species but now needs revision.
