= List of conopid fly species of Great Britain =

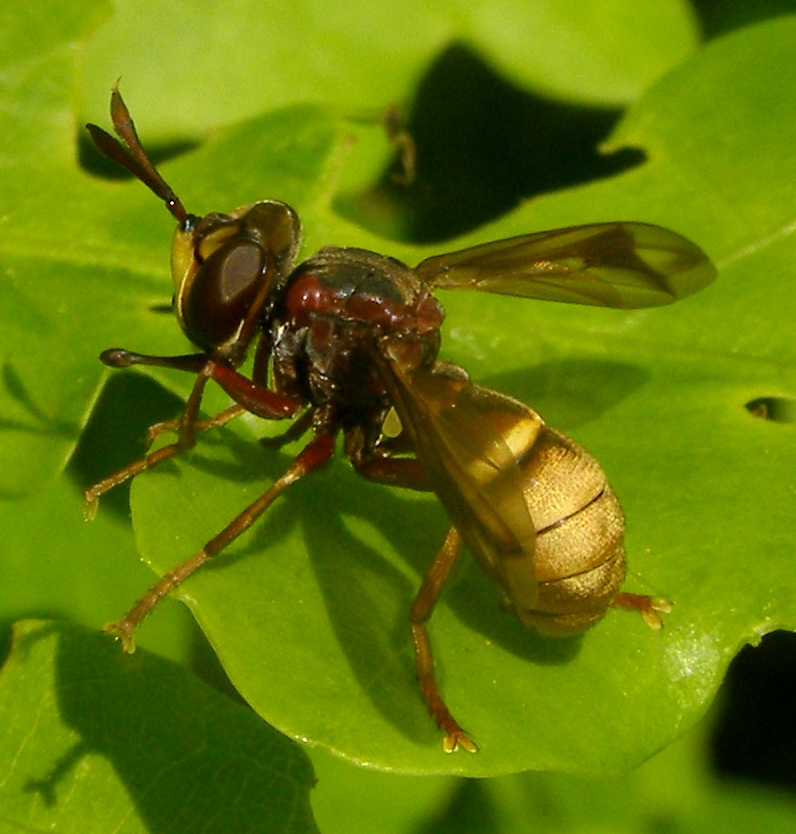
Conopid fly Conops vesicularis

The following is a list of list of the conopid fly species of Great Britain.

== Subfamily Conopinae ==
=== Tribe Conopini ===
- Genus Conops Linnaeus, 1758
  - Subgenus Conops Linnaeus, 1758
    - Conops ceriaeformis Meigen, 1824
    - Conops flavipes Linnaeus, 1758
    - Conops quadrifasciatus De Geer, 1776
    - Conops strigatus Wiedemann in Meigen, 1824
    - Conops vesicularis Linnaeus, 1761
- Genus Leopoldius Rondani, 1843
  - Leopoldius brevirostris (Germar, 1827)
  - Leopoldius signatus (Wiedemann in Meigen, 1824)

=== Tribe Physocephalini ===
- Genus Physocephala Schiner, 1861
  - Physocephala nigra (De Geer, 1776)
  - Physocephala rufipes (Fabricius, 1781)

== Subfamily Myopinae ==
=== Tribe Myopini ===
- Genus Myopa Fabricius, 1775
  - Myopa buccata (Linnaeus, 1758, 1758)
  - Myopa extricata Collin, 1960
  - Myopa fasciata Meigen, 1804
  - Myopa occulta Wiedemann in Meigen, 1824
  - Myopa polystigma Rondani, 1857
  - Myopa strandi Duda, 1940
  - Myopa tessellatipennis Motschulsky, 1859
  - Myopa testacea (Linnaeus, 1758, 1767)
  - Myopa vicaria Walker, 1849
- Genus Thecophora Rondani, 1845
  - Thecophora atra (Fabricius, 1775)
  - Thecophora fulvipes (Robineau-Desvoidy, 1830)

=== Tribe Sicini ===
- Genus Sicus Latreille, 1796
  - Sicus abdominalis Kröber, 1915
  - Sicus ferrugineus (Linnaeus, 1761)

=== Tribe Zodionini ===
- Genus Zodion Latreille, 1796
  - Zodion cinereum (Fabricius, 1794)
  - Zodion notatum (Meigen, 1804)
