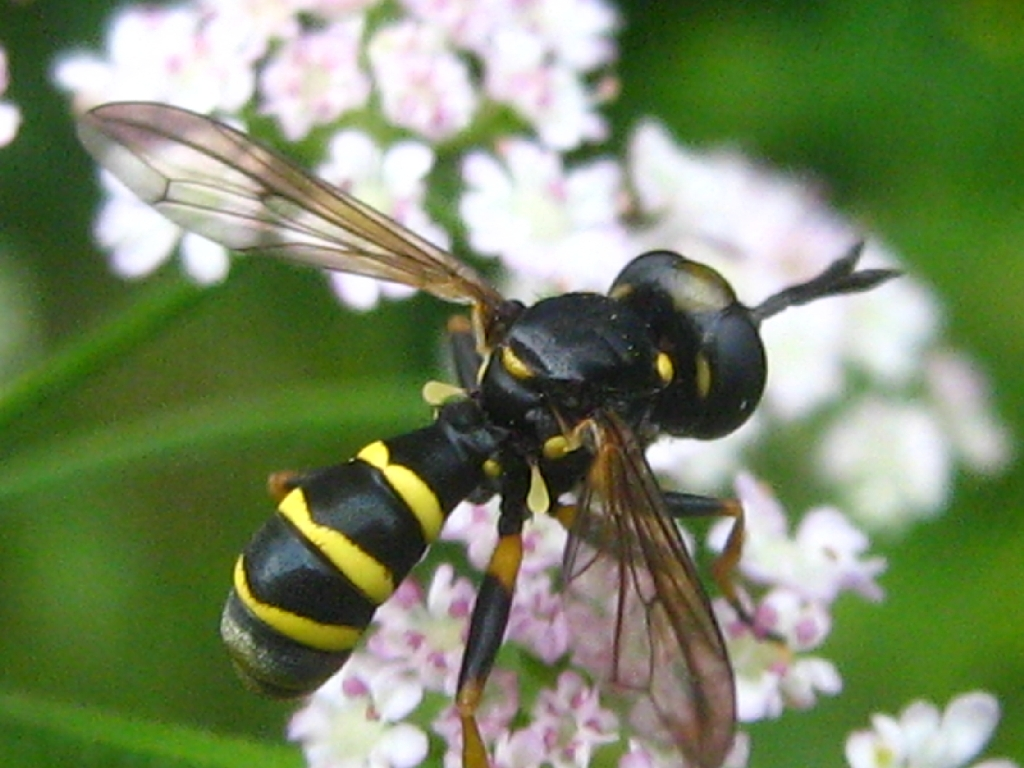
- Conops flavipes

Scientific classification
- Kingdom: Animalia
- Phylum: Arthropoda
- Clade: Pancrustacea
- Class: Insecta
- Order: Diptera
- Family: Conopidae
- Genus: Conops
- Subgenus: Conops; Linnaeus, 1758

Type species
- C. flavipes Linnaeus, 1758

= Conops (subgenus) =

Subgenus of flies

Conops is a subgenus of flies from the genus Conops in the family Conopidae.

The European species of the subgenus are:

- C. ceriaeformis Meigen, 1824
- C. flavicaudus (Bigot, 1880)
- C. flavipes Linnaeus, 1758
- C. maculatus Macquart, 1834
- C. quadrifasciatus De Geer, 1776
- C. rufiventris Macquart, 1849
- C. silaceus Wiedemann in Meigen, 1824
- C. scutellatus Meigen, 1804
- C. strigatus Wiedemann in Meigen, 1824
