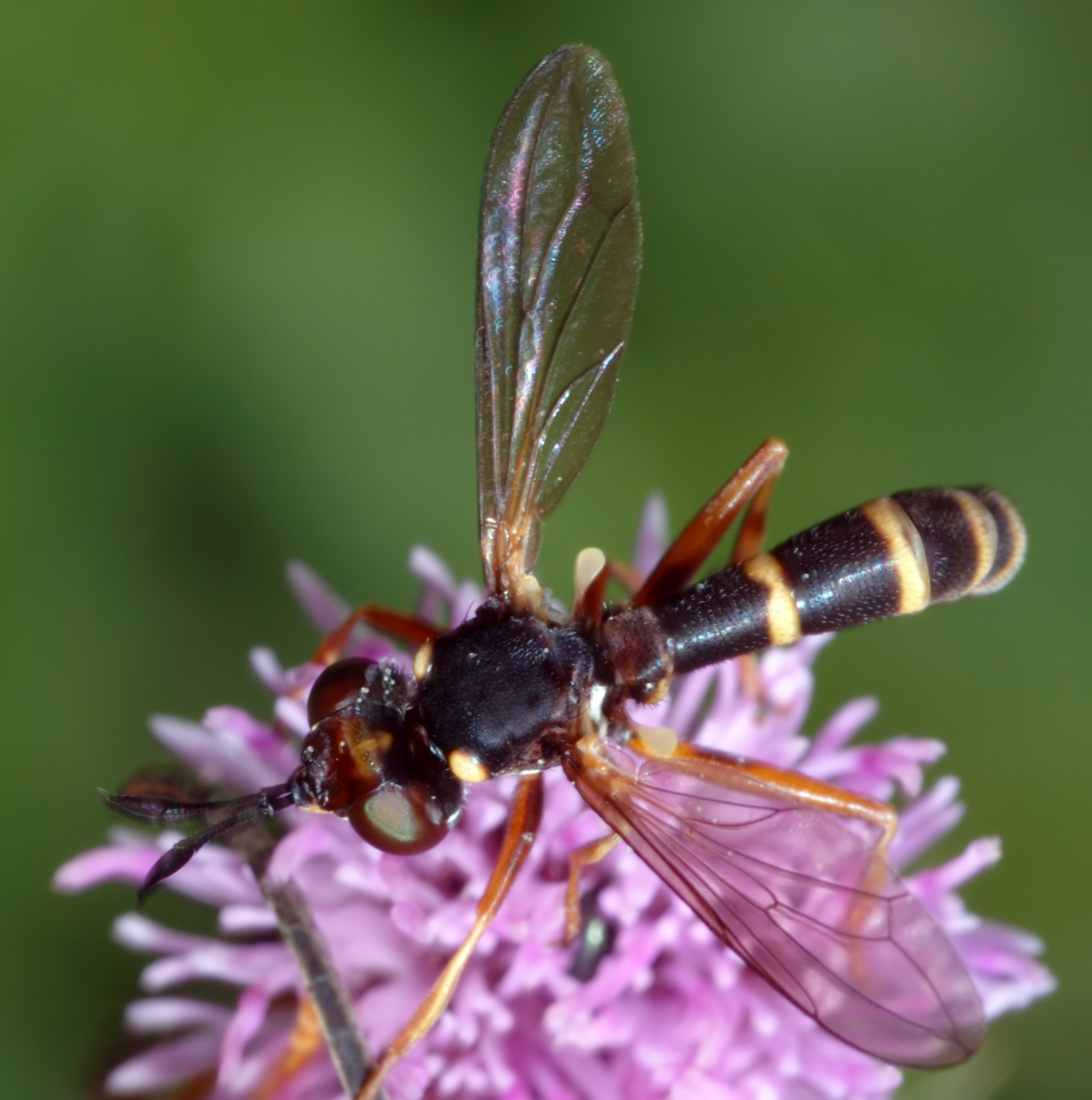
- Conops quadrifasciatus

Scientific classification
- Kingdom: Animalia
- Phylum: Arthropoda
- Clade: Pancrustacea
- Class: Insecta
- Order: Diptera
- Family: Conopidae
- Subfamily: Conopinae
- Tribe: Conopini

Genera
- See text

= Conopini =

Tribe of flies

Conopini is a tribe of the flies family Conopidae. The larvae of species are parasitic on bees, especially bumblebees. Most adults will feed on nectar.

== Genera and subgenera ==
- Genus Conops Linnaeus, 1758
  - Subgenus Asiconops Chen, 1939
  - Subgenus Conops Linnaeus, 1758
  - Subgenus Diconops Camras, 1957
  - Subgenus Sphenoconops Camras, 1955
- Genus Leopoldius Rondani, 1843
- Genus Physocephala Schiner, 1861
- Genus Physoconops Szilady, 1926
  - Subgenus Aconops Kröber, 1917
  - Subgenus Gyroconops Camras, 1955
  - Subgenus Pachyconops Camras 1955
