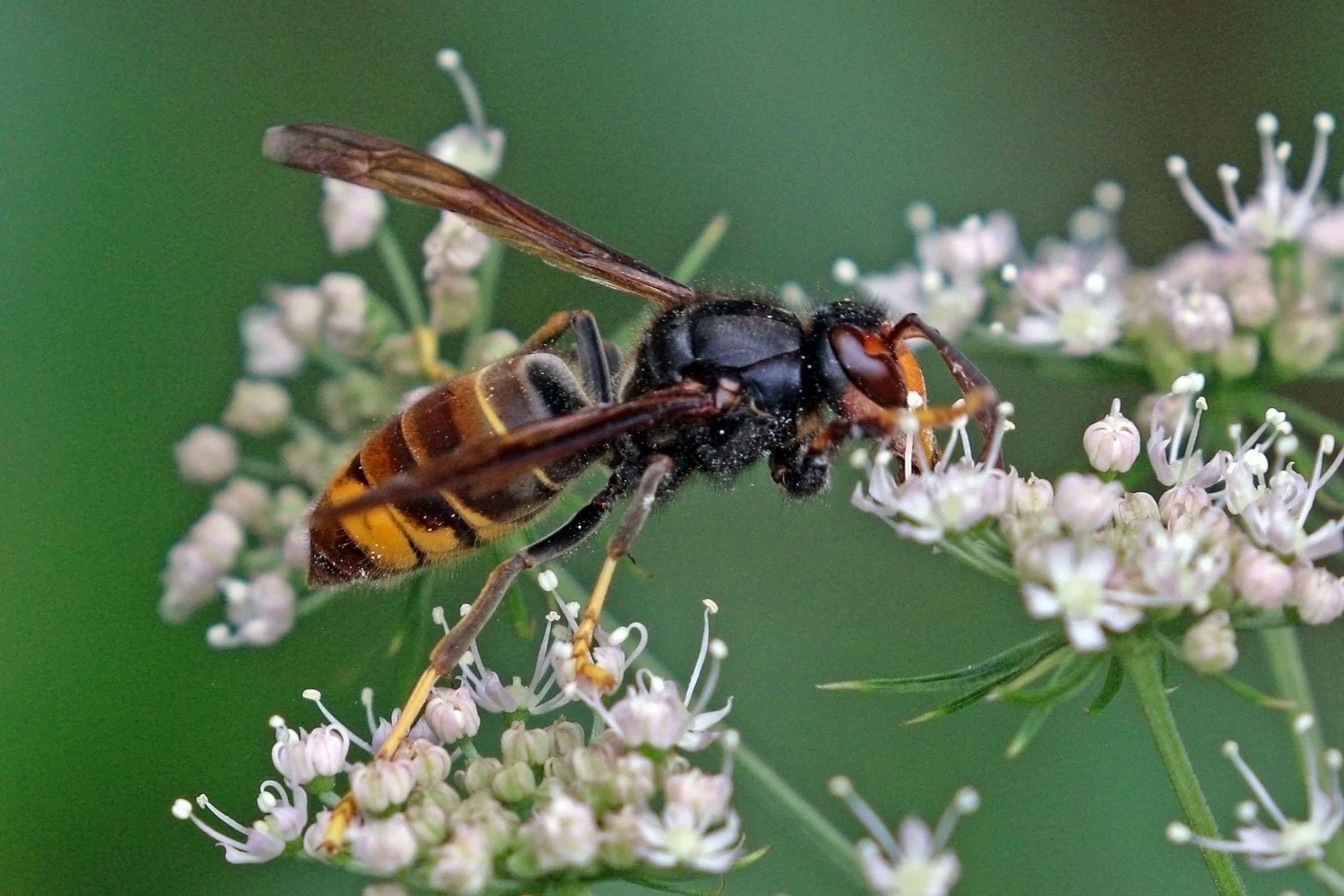

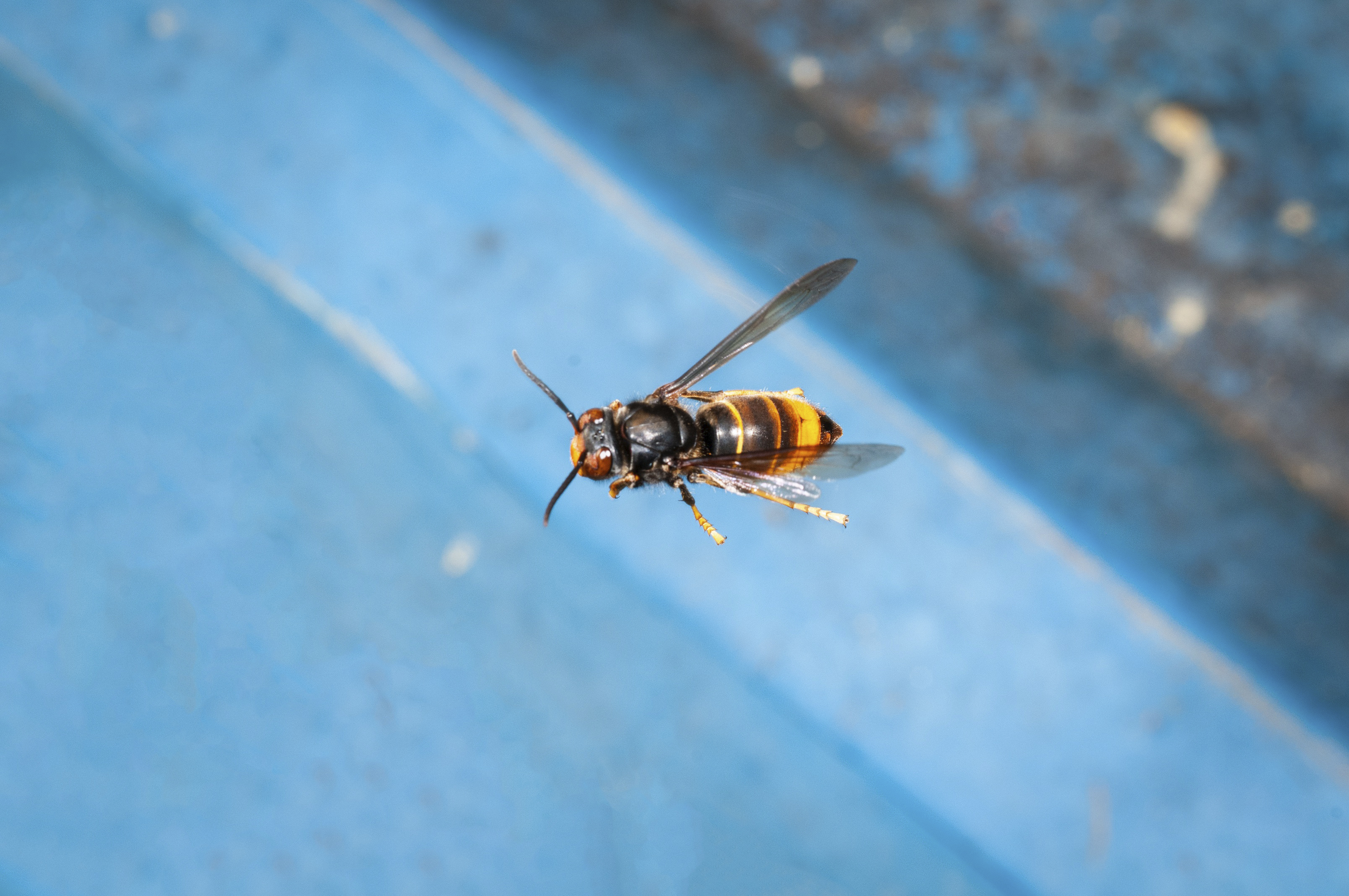
- Vespa velutina, adult, South Korea

Scientific classification
- Kingdom: Animalia
- Phylum: Arthropoda
- Clade: Pancrustacea
- Class: Insecta
- Order: Hymenoptera
- Family: Vespidae
- Genus: Vespa
- Species: V. velutina

Binomial name
- Vespa velutina Lepeletier, 1836

= Asian hornet =

Species of insect

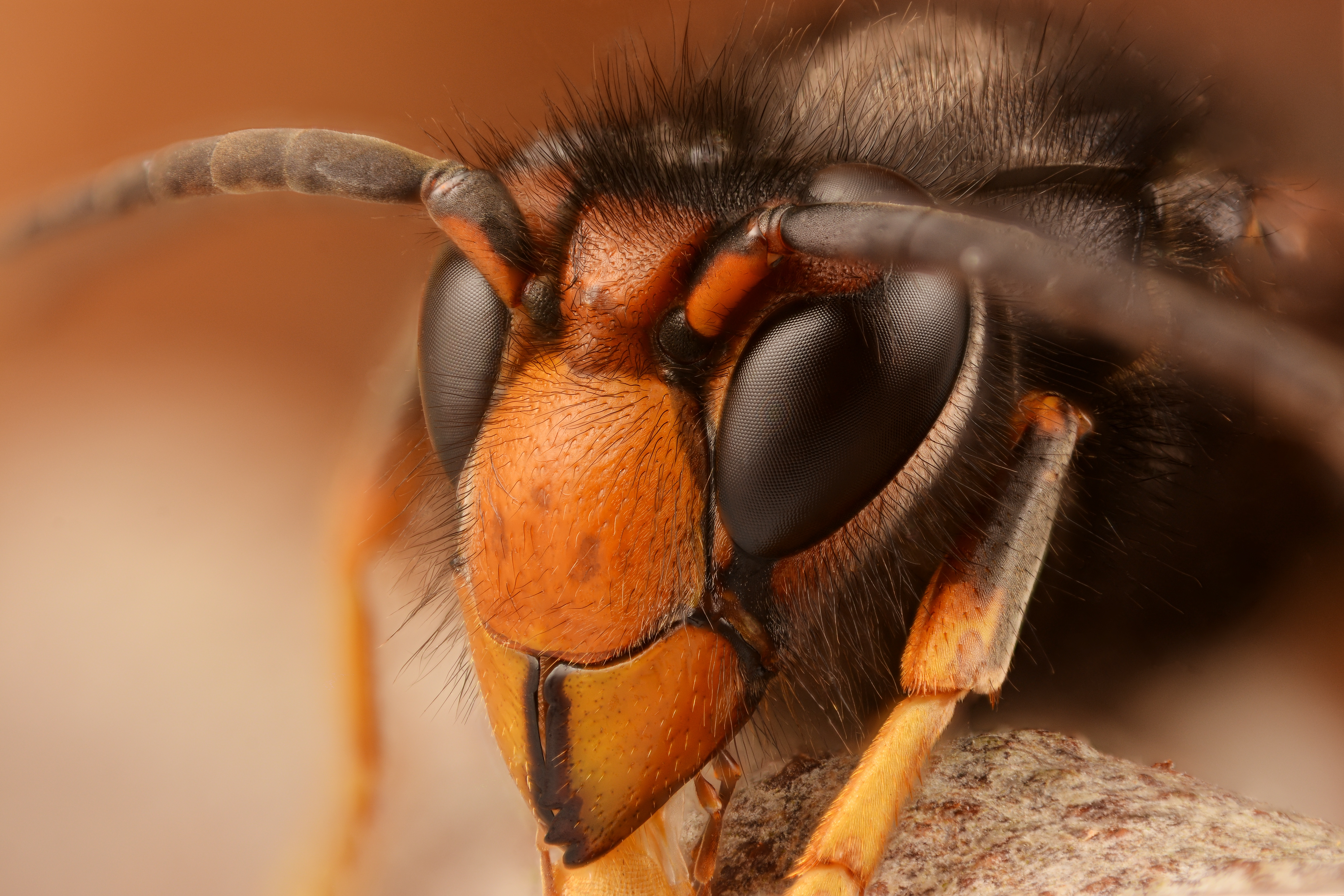
Detail of facial anatomy, showing hairy, orange mandibles, clypeus and vertex

The Asian hornet (Vespa velutina), also known as the yellow-legged hornet or Asian predatory wasp, is a species of hornet indigenous to Southeast Asia. It is of concern as an invasive species in some other countries, including most of Europe. The species has continued to spread and has recently been introduced to New Zealand, Algeria, and the Southeast United States.

== Appearance ==
Vespa velutina is significantly smaller than the European hornet. Typically, queens are 30 mm (1.2 in) long, and males about 24 mm (0.94 in). Workers are about 20 mm (0.79 in) long. The species has distinctive yellow tarsi (legs). The thorax is a velvety brown or black with a brown abdomen. Each abdominal segment has a narrow posterior yellow border, except for the fourth segment, which is orange. The head is black and the face yellow. Regional forms vary sufficiently in colour to cause difficulties in classification, and several subspecies have been variously identified and ultimately rejected; while there is a history of recognising subspecies within many of the Vespa species, including V. velutina, the most recent taxonomic revision of the genus treats all subspecific names in the genus Vespa as synonyms, effectively relegating them to no more than informal names for regional colour forms. The colour form causing concern about its invasiveness in Europe has been referred to as V. v. nigrithorax, though this name no longer has any taxonomic standing.

== Biology ==
Like other hornets, V. velutina builds nests that may house colonies of several thousand individuals. Females in the colony are armed with formidable stingers with which they defend their nests and kill their prey. The nest is of paper, roughly in the shape of a huge egg, usually at least 50 cm (20 in) long. Unlike the nest of the European hornet (V. crabro), its exit is usually lateral rather than at the bottom. The nesting season is long, and a colony commonly begins by building a nest in a low shrub, then abandoning it after some months and rapidly building a new one high in a tree, possibly as an antiparasitic measure. The next generation of young queens disperses in the late autumn to hibernate over winter.

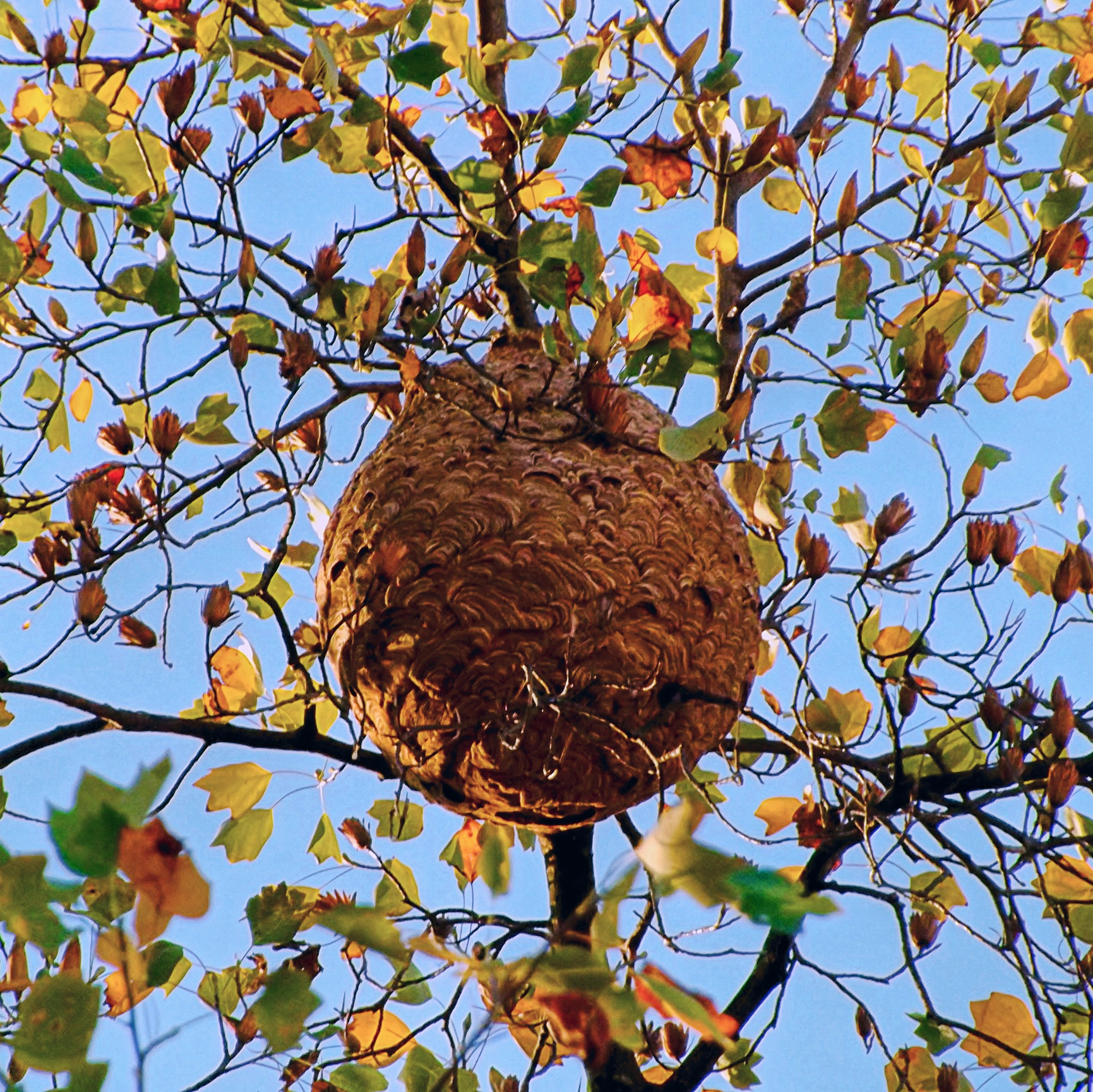
V. velutina nest on tree

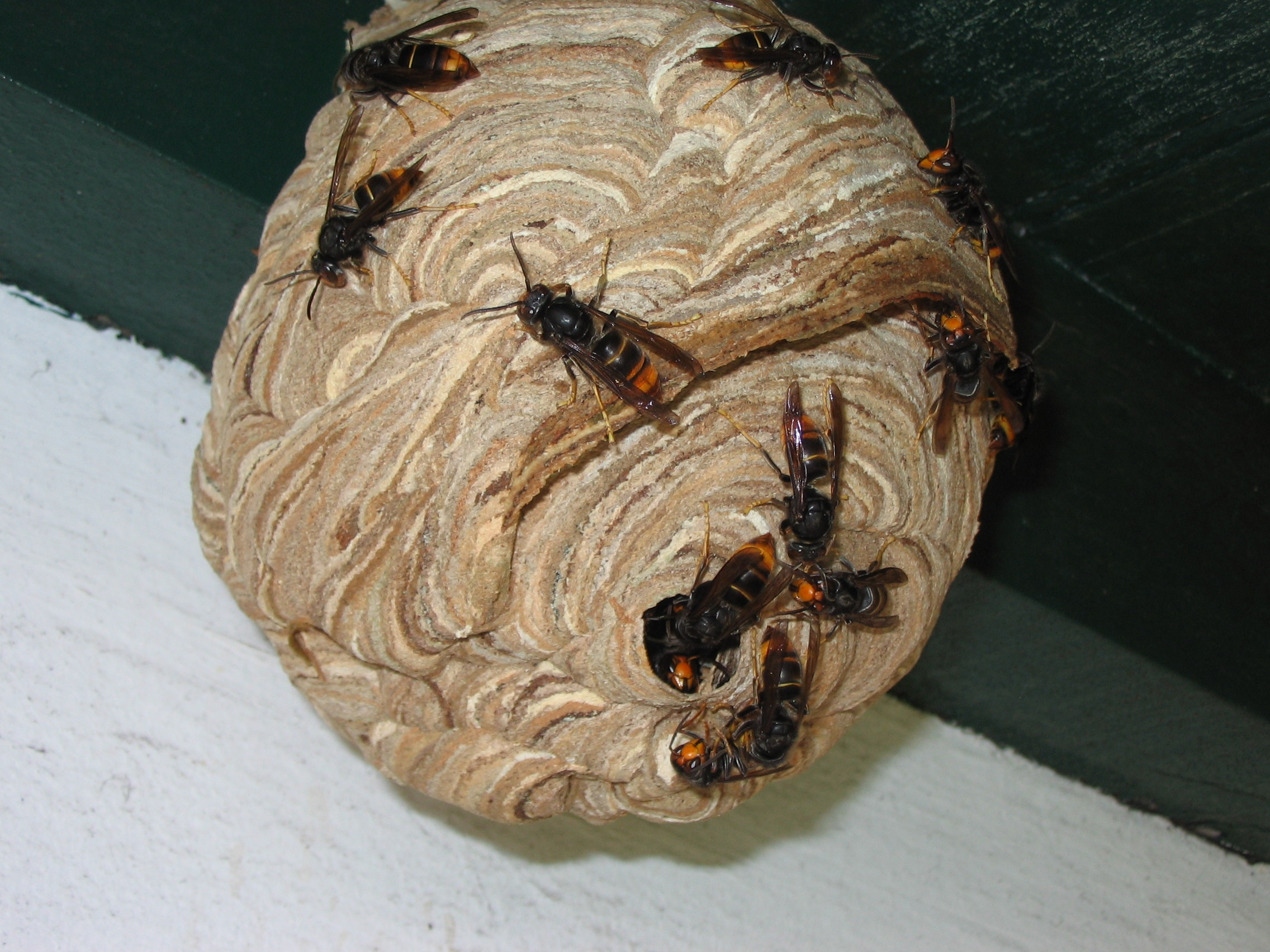
V. velutina nest

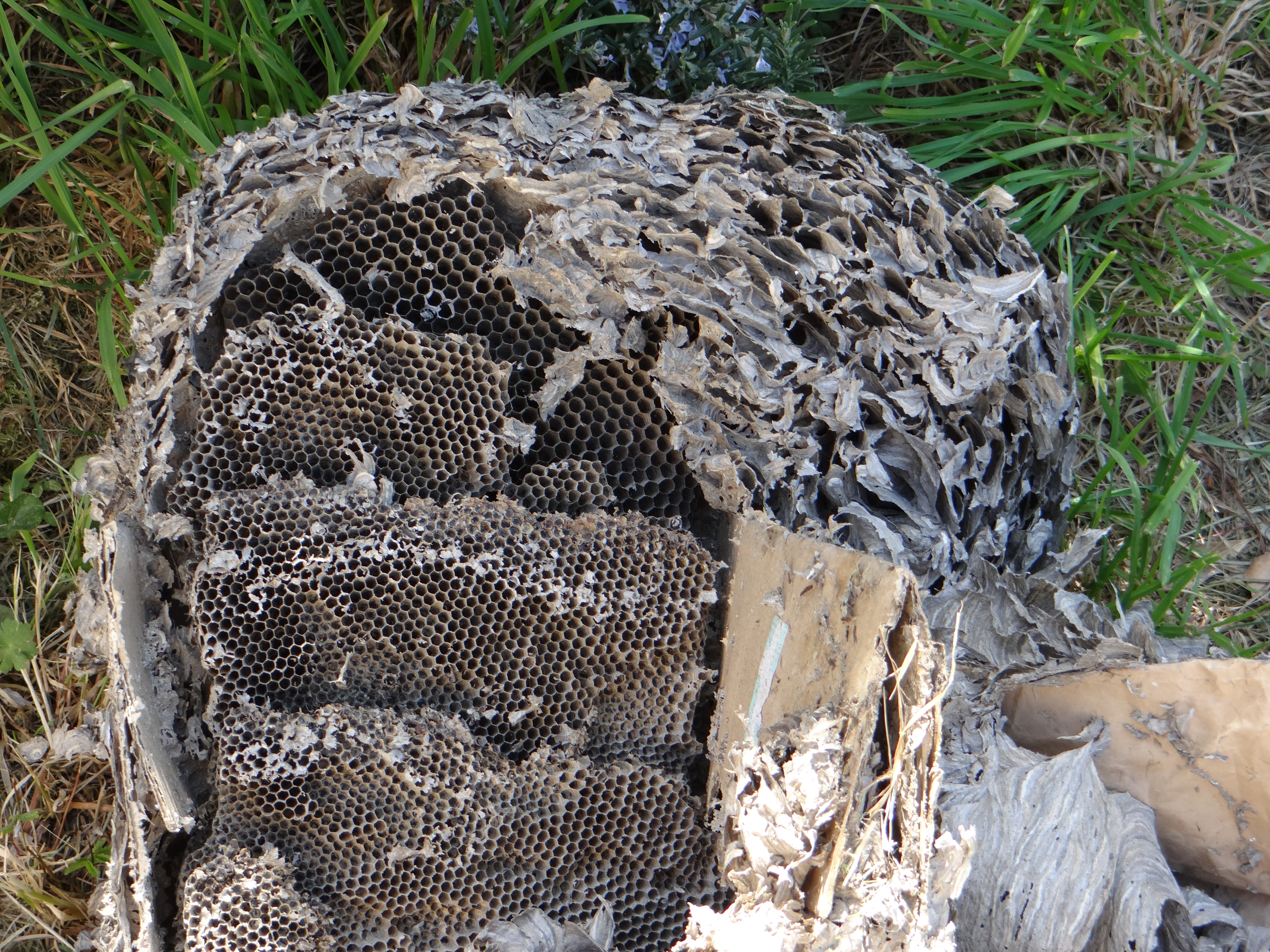
Inner structure of nest

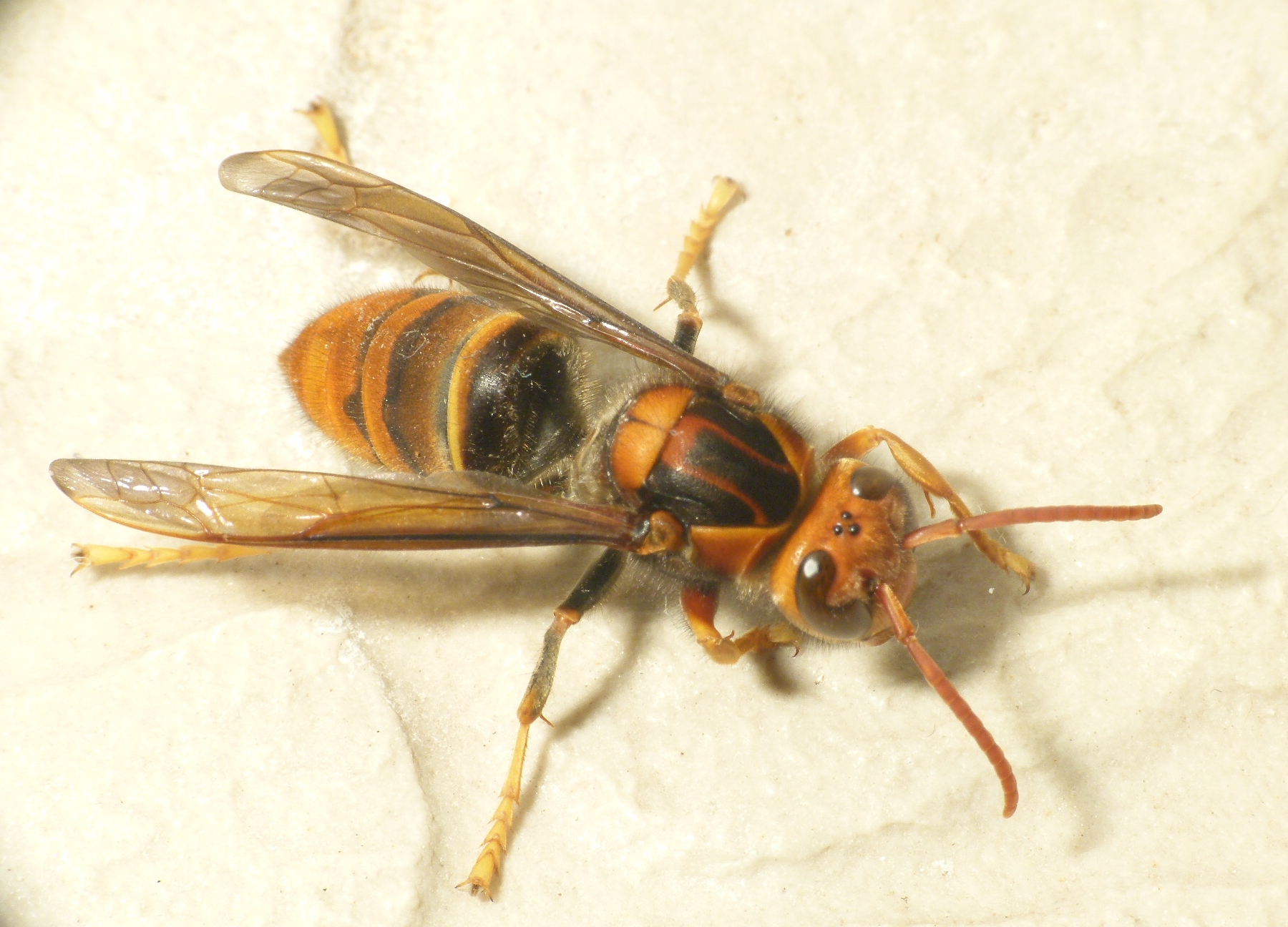
V. velutina from the Central Himalayas, India

V. velutina opportunistically hunts a very wide range of insects, including flies, dragonflies, and Orthoptera, typically capturing them by pursuit.

=== Predation on honeybees ===
The major concern about their invasiveness, however, is that when they find a honeybee colony or an apiary, they tend to settle down and specialise in honeybees as their prey, as do the larger Japanese giant hornets. A hornet occupies a position above a beehive as its hunting territory. It flies about within an area of about 0.5 m^{2} (0.60 sq yd), scanning the direction from which foraging honeybees return to the hive. Each hornet vigorously defends its hunting territory, chasing off any rivals. As soon as it catches a bee, though, it flies off and another hornet replaces it, usually within a few seconds. The circadian activities of the two species are similar, and the hunting hornets match them; their most intense activity is in the morning and afternoon, not near dusk or noon.

In its native range, V. velutina mainly hunts Apis cerana, the eastern honeybee, which has evolved a strategy of avoiding hovering hornets by rapid entry and exit from the hive when hornets are about. The guard bees also ball hornets to death, with large numbers of bees surrounding the hornet and vibrating their flight muscles, thus raising the temperature to a level that is survivable by the bees, but lethal to the hornet. However, where A. mellifera, the western honeybee, has been imported, V. velutina finds them easier prey than A. cerana, because A. mellifera has not been subjected to selection for countering concentrated hawking by hornets. For example, A. mellifera bees approach their hives more indirectly and slowly when they detect hawking hornets, instead of darting in as fast as possible in the way that A. cerana does. They also ball hornets, but less effectively, and they do not achieve as high a temperature in the ball. Furthermore, when they detect that hornets are hawking, A. cerana tends to withdraw into the nest, but A. mellifera does not.

A. cerana guard bees also use wing shimmering in response to the presence of V. velutina. This has variously been suggested to be an aposematic signal or a strategy for disruption of visual patterns, similar to the behaviour of Apis cerana nuluensis and Apis dorsata, but instead has been shown, in conjunction with rocking, to be endothermic heat production in preparation for a ball attack on the hornet. Whilst A. mellifera bees also ball attack hornets, they exhibit no such endothermic heat production behaviour, and when A. mellifera occurs together with A. cerana, the hornet V. velutina preferentially hawks A. mellifera foragers.

== Distribution ==
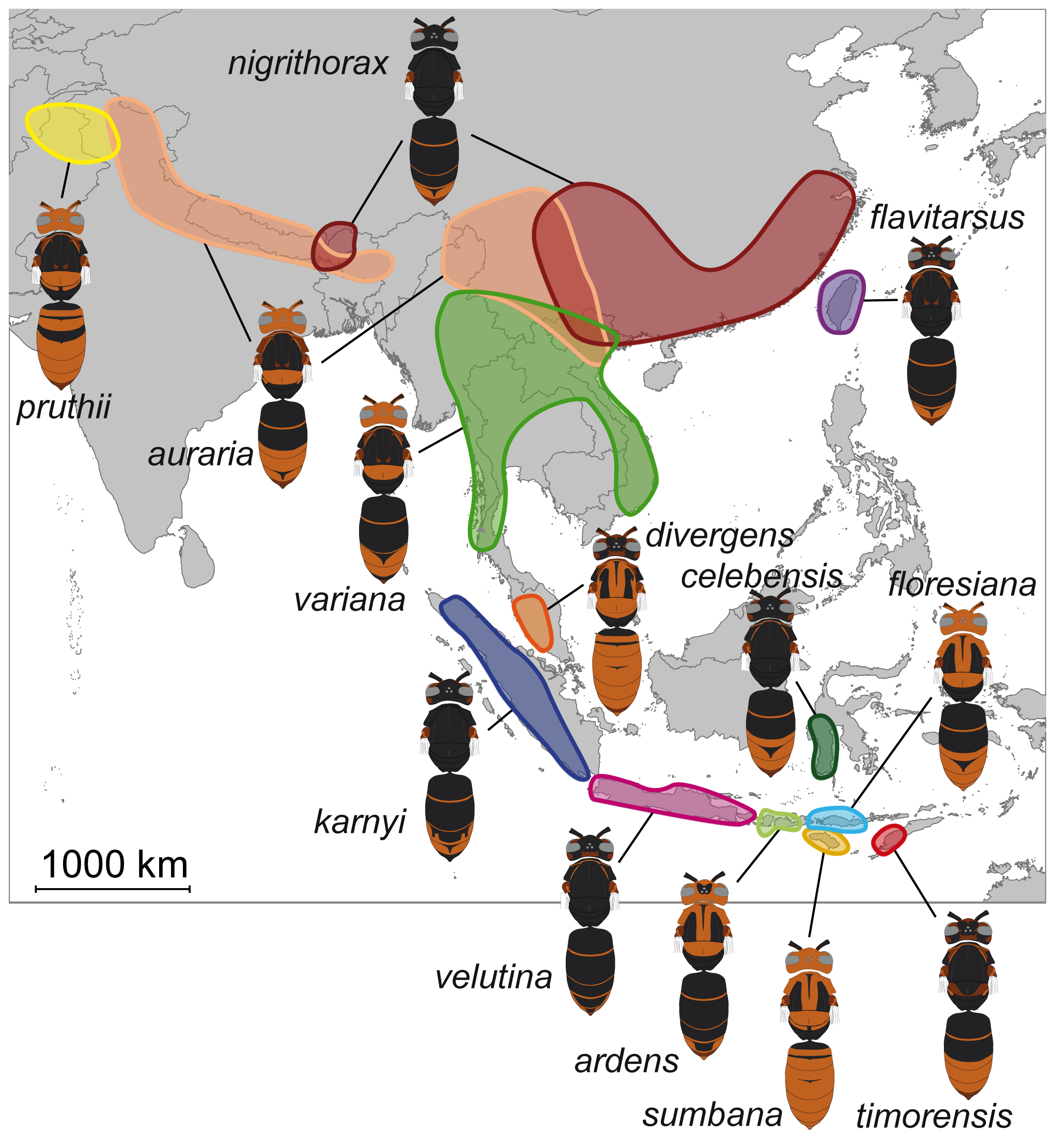
Known distribution of the different colour forms of Vespa velutina across Southeast Asia

V. velutina originates from Southeast Asia, particularly the tropical regions of northern India, Pakistan, Afghanistan, Bhutan, China, Taiwan, Burma, Thailand, Laos, Vietnam, Malaysia, the Indo-Chinese peninsula, and surrounding archipelagoes.

=== Pest status and invasiveness ===
As an invasive species, the Asian hornet appeared earliest in France, Spain, Portugal, South Korea, and Japan. Further invasions are ongoing in various countries, including much of Europe. Humans have been attacked after disturbing hornets; although the species is not aggressive, it "charges in a group as soon as it feels its nest is threatened". People have been hospitalised in France after suffering anaphylactic shock as a result of multiple stings. Because of Asian hornets' larger size, their stings are more serious than those of western honeybees. In November 2017, a man was killed in Galicia, Spain, after being stung over 20 times while pruning an apple tree. Several people have died in south west France near the original introduction site, including a resident of Chaillevette, Charente-Maritime, a 60-year-old woman in Gironde, Nouvelle-Aquitaine in 2019, and a farmer in Orival, Charente in 2020. Nineteen Asian hornet sightings have been confirmed in England between 2016 and 2020, including ten nests, all of which were destroyed.

The Asian hornet has been reported as naturalised on the Japanese island of Tsushima since about 2010.

In Europe, the Asian hornet is included since 2016 in the list of Invasive Alien Species of Union concern ("the Union list"), meaning that it cannot be intentionally imported, kept, bred, transported (except for purposes of eradication), offered for sale, used or exchanged, permitted to reproduce in any way, or released into the environment, in the European Union.

In August 2023, the Georgia Department of Agriculture, in coordination with the United States Department of Agriculture Plant and Animal Health Inspection Service and the University of Georgia, confirmed the presence of a yellow-legged hornet near Savannah, Georgia. This is the first time a live specimen of this species has been detected in the United States. This was followed by the first report of the species from South Carolina in November 2023 and the discovery of nests in 2024. By the end of 2025 nests have been discovered in a 8,000 km^{2} area within the states. Genetic testing has determined that the US invasive wasps originated from an Asian population, rather than an invasive European population.

Climate change may increase invasive success of the yellow-legged hornet in northern Europe and the US due to increased temperatures, although warmer temperatures are not necessary for the establishment of this species in these regions.

==== Control ====
Particularly in regions where hornets are beginning to spread, but are not established, control is focused on locating and destroying nests. In the UK, the public are encouraged to report suspected sightings using the Asian Hornet Watch mobile app. When sightings have occurred, food traps at different locations are used to attract hornets, then monitor the direction and timing of their flights; this makes inferring the likely location of a nest possible. Tiny GPS radio trackers attached to insects and AI-assisted cameras can narrow down the location. When the search converges on a location, the nest is sought visually and destroyed.

=== Timeline of spread across Europe ===
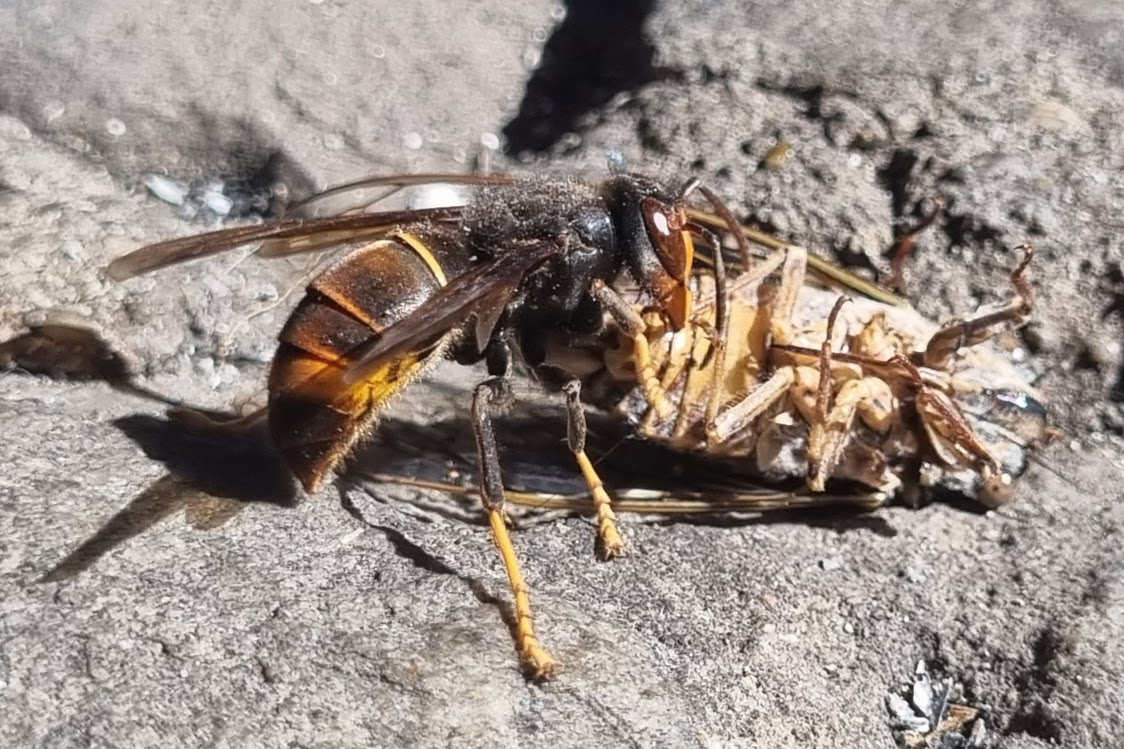
Invasive Asian hornet preying on a common cicada in Liguria, Italy

V. velutina has become an invasive species in France, where it is believed to have arrived in boxes of pottery from China in 2004. By 2009, several thousand nests were in the area of Bordeaux and surrounding departments, and by the end of 2015, they were reported over most of France.

The Asian hornet spread to northern Spain, as confirmed in 2010 by the Beekeepers' Association of the Basque Country (Gipuzkoako Erlezainen Elkartea) and the Neiker entomology institute in Irún, after breeding colonies were found. In September 2013, a beekeeper from Rasines, Cantabria, documented the hornets' presence in two specimens. In June 2015, firemen destroyed a nest in Santander.

It was first reported in Portugal in 2011. The first observation in southern Belgium was also reported in 2011. By 2017, the species had spread across the country.

It was reported in Liguria, Italy, in 2012. According to Italian Beekepers' Association in 2017, the Asian hornet was well established in northwestern regions of Italy, and colonisation is steadily advancing.

The Asian hornet was first sighted in Germany in 2014. Following a series of warm and dry summers, the population tripled between 2021 and 2022.

The first sighting on the UK mainland was announced on 20 September 2016 and occurred near Tetbury in Gloucestershire; the nest was found and destroyed, and no breeding adults were found within. A nest was reported on the Channel Island of Alderney in 2016. In 2023, 72 nests were discovered. By 2025, the hornets, considered a "significant threat" to honeybees and other pollinators, were being tracked using transmitters to find nests.

In 2017, the first observation in the Netherlands was recorded in Zeeland. In 2023, V. velutina was reported in all provinces.

In 2017, the Asian hornet was first spotted in Switzerland, with the number of nests in the Geneva area expanding to over 3,000 by 2025.

In 2020, the first record for Luxembourg was reported.

In 2023, an Asian hornet was discovered in the Czech Republic and several nests were located and destroyed in Plzeň.

In 2023, it appeared in Hungary, the first ones were captured near Kimle.

In 2024, a V. velutina queen was found in Salzburg, Austria, with no other individuals reported since.

In 2024, a nest was tracked, located, and destroyed in Palárikovo, Slovakia, with another nest being found 14.5km away a month later, in October. In 2025, a mated female was found in goods shipped from Germany, and later in another shipment from Hungary.

In 2025 in Ireland, a nest was discovered in Cork city.

In 2025 a single hornet was spotted in Kertinge nor, located on the island of Funen, Denmark.

In 2025 a V. velutina nest was located and destroyed in Northern Ireland.

=== New Zealand ===
In 2025 in Auckland, New Zealand, nests, queens, and males have been found. The first detections were of two "old and slow" males found in winter in the suburbs of Grafton and Albany. On 17 October, a queen was found in Glenfield, in the process of building a nest. The public were encouraged to look out for the hornets, and by 12 December, 36 confirmed queen hornets had been found, with many in the process of building nests. On the 11 December, the watch zone was extended from 5 km around Glenfield and Birkdale, to 11 km. By mid-May 2026, 132 nests had been located and destroyed. Elements of the biosecurity response include a public-education campaign, a variety of traps and lures, electronic tracking of worker hornets, and ground surveys and property inspections by Biosecurity New Zealand. Environmental DNA was also trialed for tracking the invasive hornets.

=== Algeria ===
In Algeria, the Asian hornet (V. velutina) was recorded for the first time in September 2025 in the commune of Birkhadem, located in the province of Algiers. A single adult specimen was collected on 16 September 2025 in a garden. This observation constitutes the first record of the species in Algeria and extends its distribution range to North Africa. It highlights the need for early surveillance and the implementation of control measures to limit its establishment and spread.

=== Biocontrol ===
Biocontrol of V. velutina has been attempted using Sarracenia purpurea - the purple pitcher plant. Pitcher plants are natural bottle traps. Both of these are invasives in France and pitchers were found to be naturally catching hornets, so were investigated as a biocontrol. However, S. purpurea has been judged too unselective to use after closer study. The endoparasitic fly Conops vesicularis has been found to attack V. velutina queens in France, preventing the affected queens from establishing colonies. In South Korea, two species of Xenos (Strepsiptera) have been found to parasitise the yellow-legged hornet. Scientists in Spain found a European honey buzzard had preyed on hornets as soon as they reached its territory, showcasing the potential of this predatory bird as a way to mitigate the invasion.

== Larvae as human food ==
According to a 2020 study in Korea, the larvae of V. velutina could be a potential food source, similar to the larvae of the Asian giant hornet (V. mandarinia), which are a Japanese delicacy.

== Gallery ==
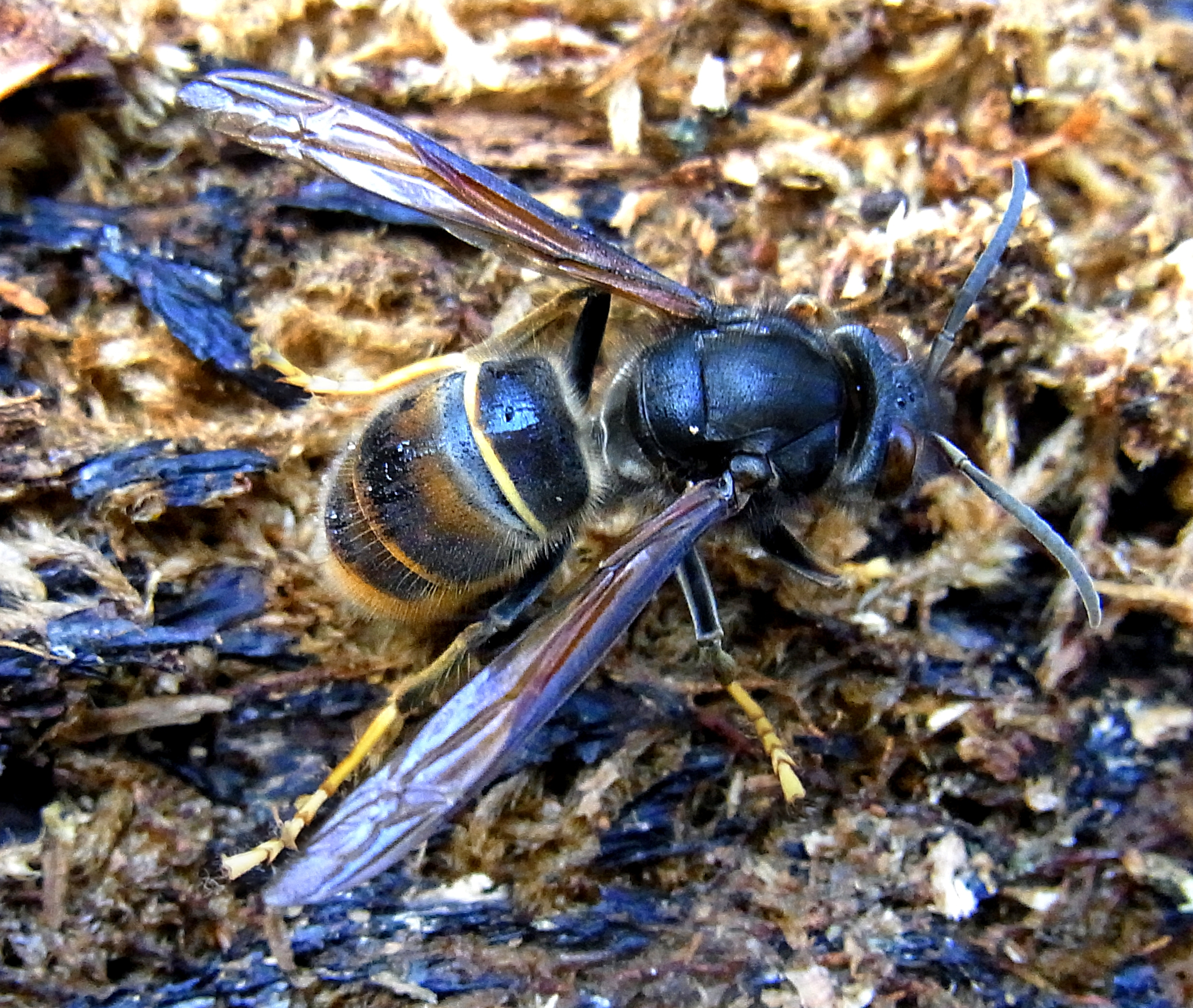
V. velutina - usual colour variant, dorsal aspect

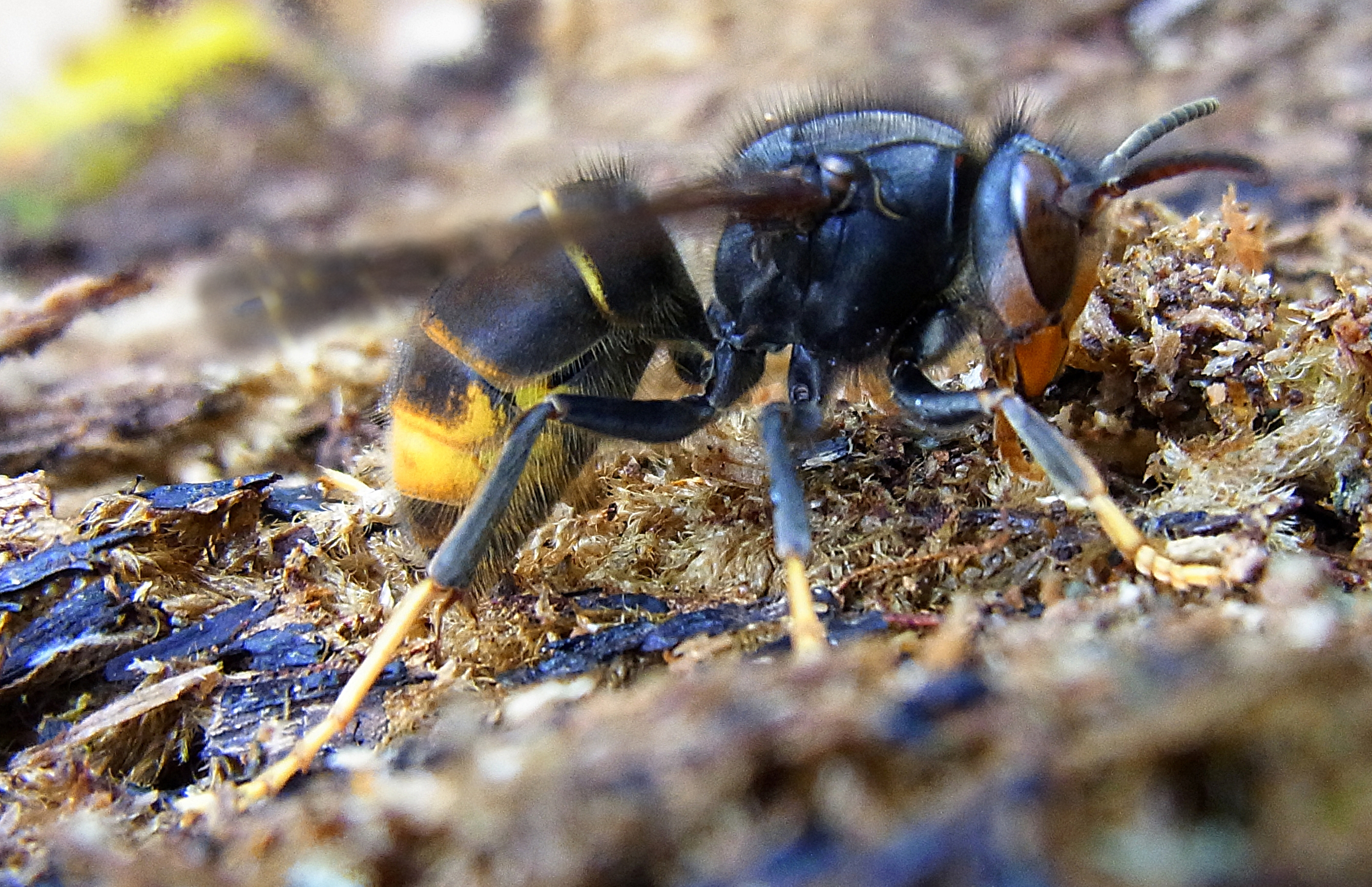
V. velutina - usual colour variant, lateral aspect

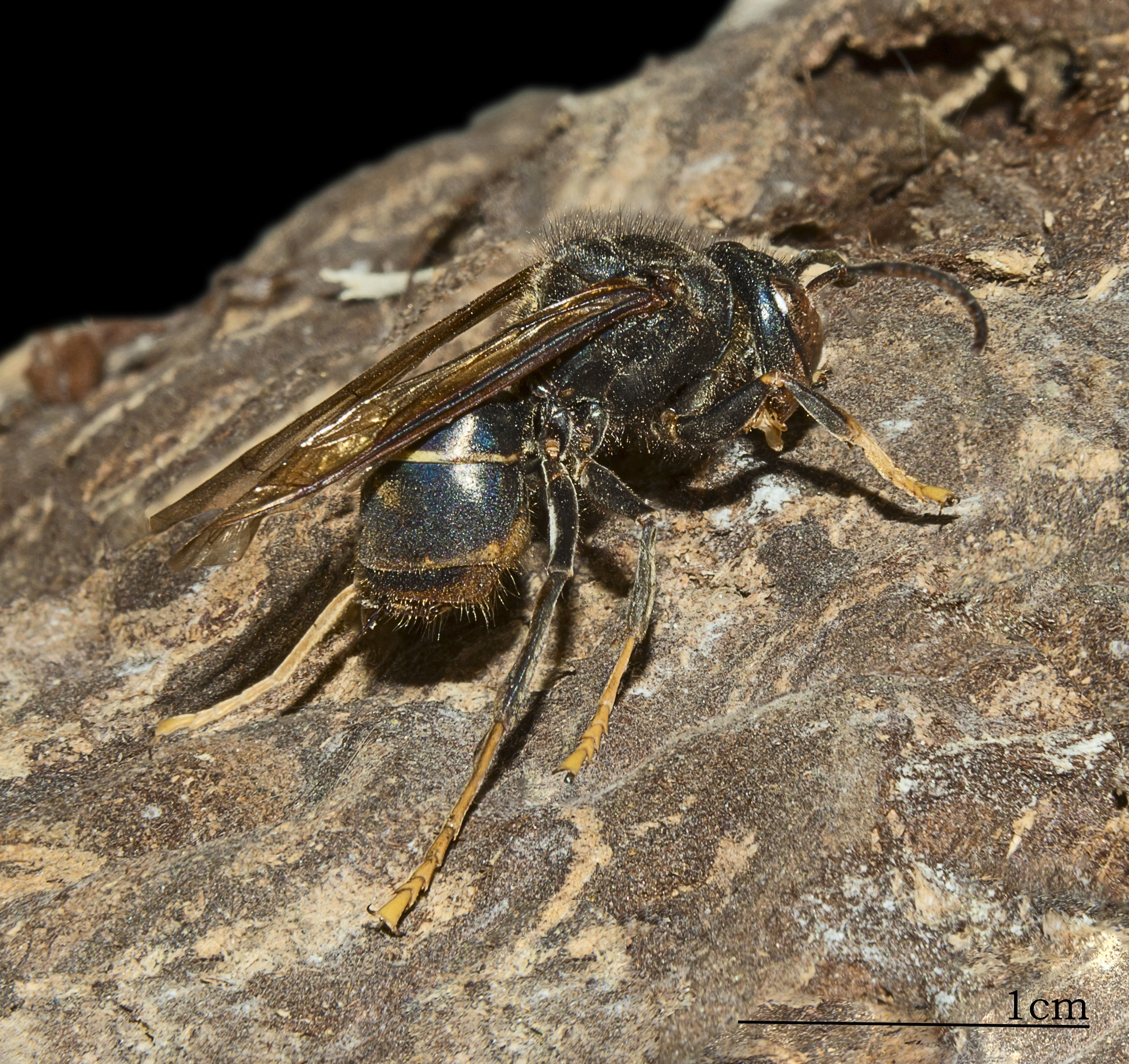
V. velutina colour form nigrithorax, dark colour variant - Toulouse

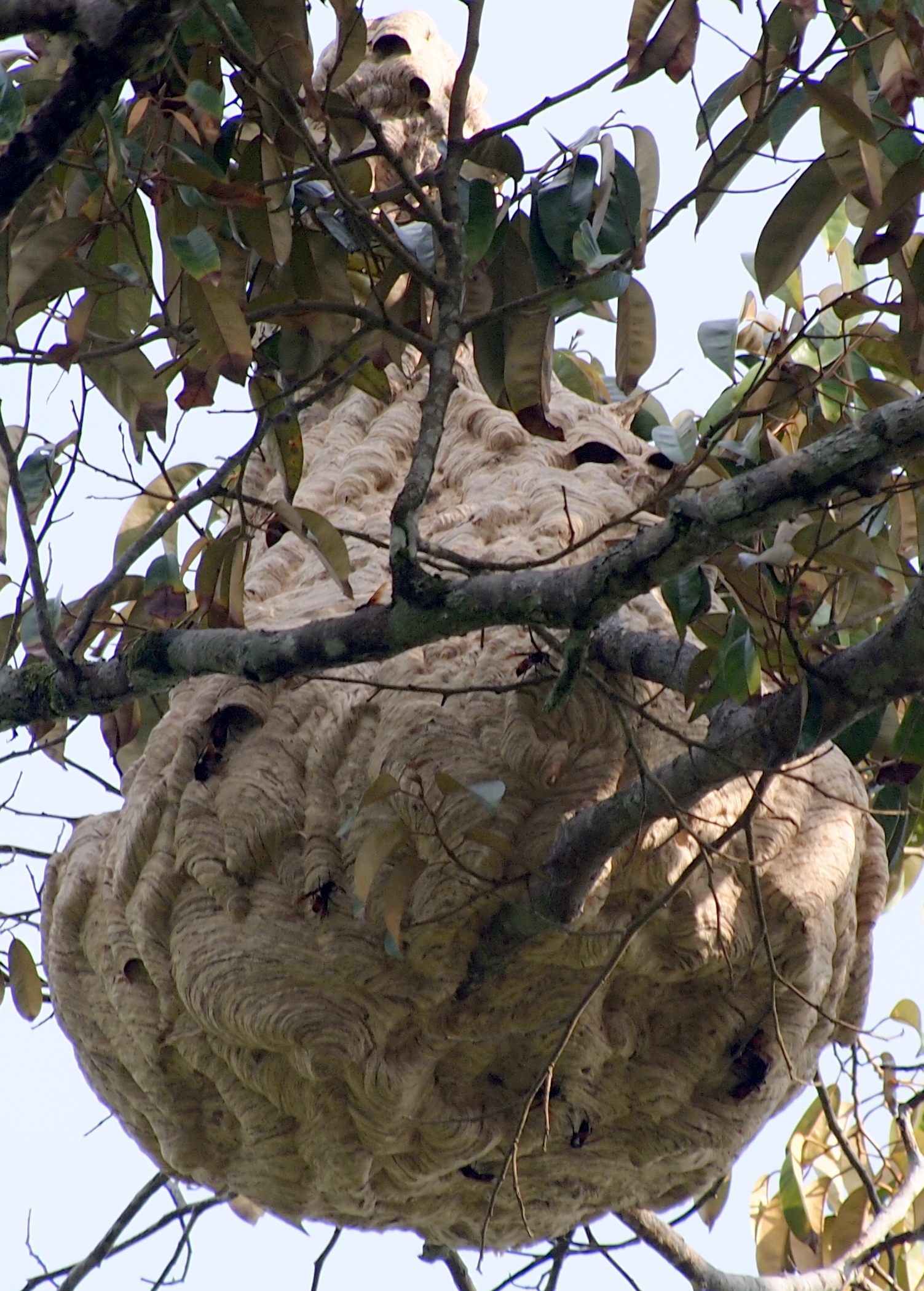
Nest of V. velutina about 30 feet up on a durian tree in Malaysia

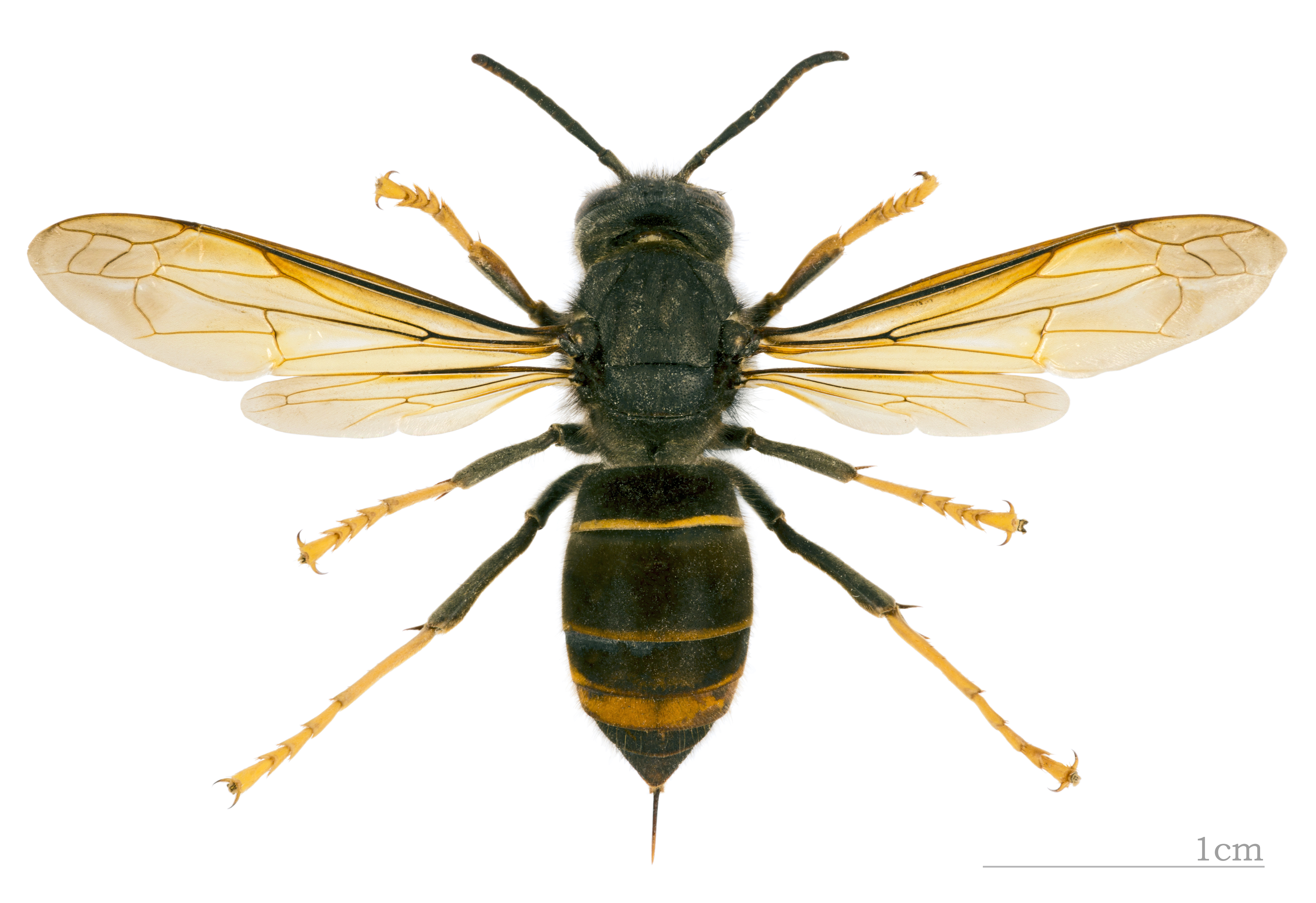
Mounted specimen

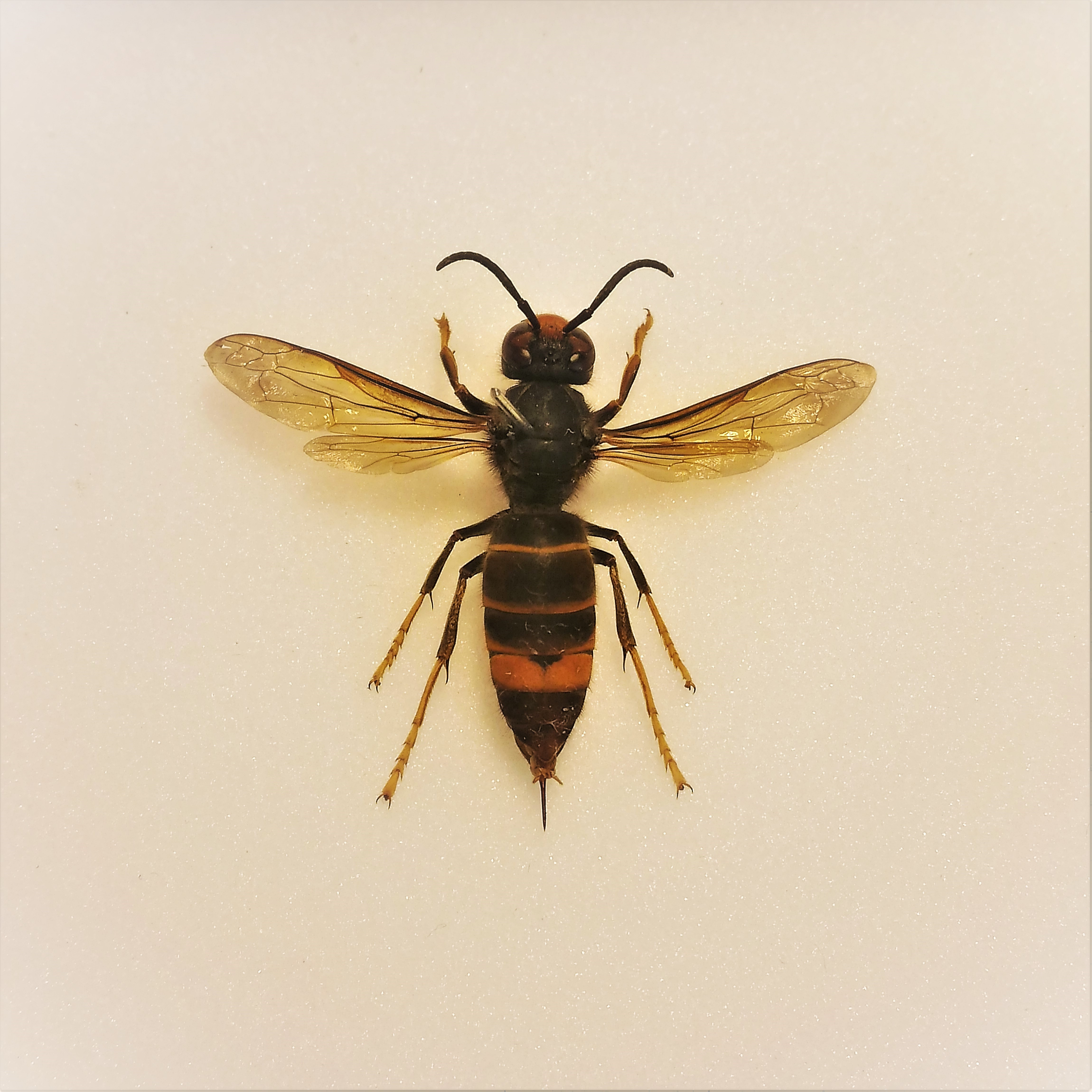
Female of V. velutina, private collection, F. Turetta
