= Asiconops =

Scientific classification
- Kingdom: Animalia
- Phylum: Arthropoda
- Clade: Pancrustacea
- Class: Insecta
- Order: Diptera
- Family: Conopidae
- Genus: Conops
- Subgenus: Asiconops; Chen, 1939

Type species
- C. aureomaculatus Kröber 1933

Subgenus of flies

Asiconops is a subgenus of flies from the genus Conops in the family Conopidae.

The European species of the subgenus are:

- C. elegans Meigen, 1824
- C. flavifrons Meigen, 1824
- C. insignis Loew, 1848
- C. longiventris Kröber, 1916
- C. weinbergae Camras & Chvála, 1984
