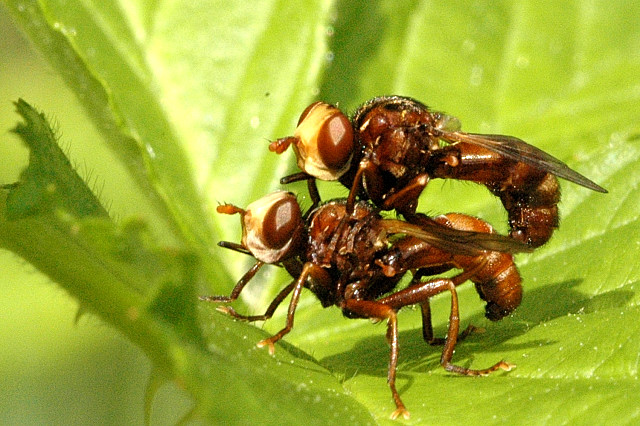
- Sicus ferrugineus in copula

Scientific classification
- Kingdom: Animalia
- Phylum: Arthropoda
- Clade: Pancrustacea
- Class: Insecta
- Order: Diptera
- Family: Conopidae
- Subfamily: Myopinae
- Tribe: Sicini; Latreille, 1796

Genera
- See text

= Sicini =

Tribe of flies

Sicini is a tribe of flies from the family Conopidae.

== Genera ==
- Sicus Scopoli, 1763
