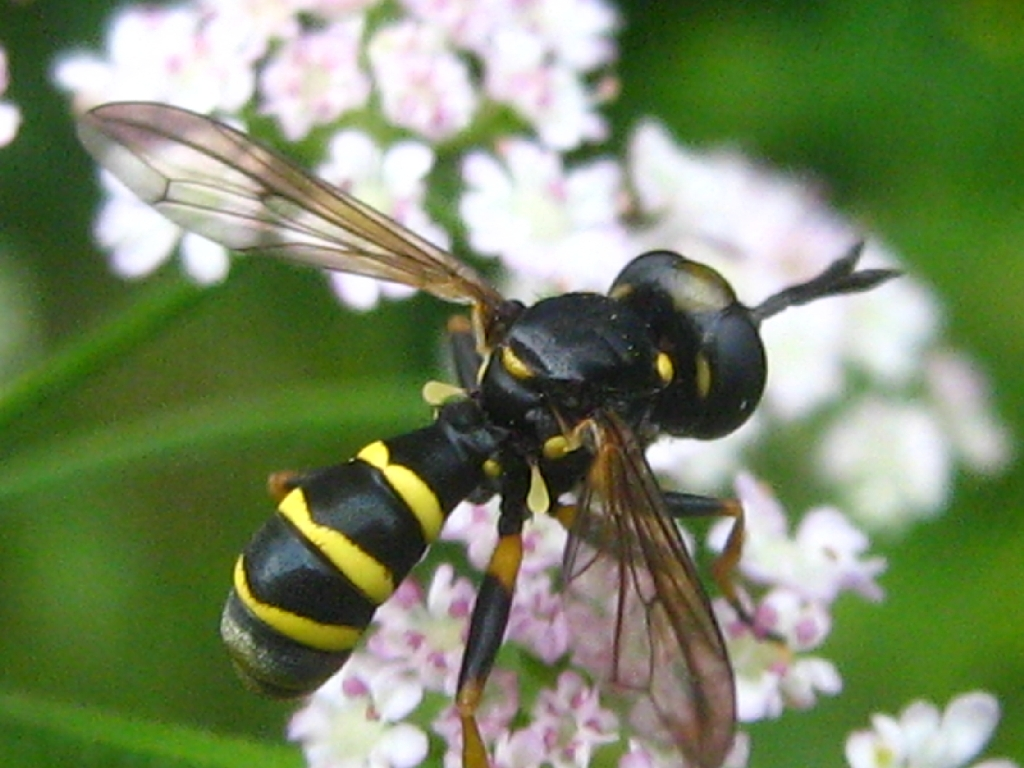
- Conops flavipes

Scientific classification
- Kingdom: Animalia
- Phylum: Arthropoda
- Clade: Pancrustacea
- Class: Insecta
- Order: Diptera
- Family: Conopidae
- Subfamily: Conopinae
- Tribe: Conopini
- Genus: Conops; Linnaeus, 1758

Type species
- C. flavipes Linnaeus, 1758

Subgenera
- Conops Linnaeus, 1758; Asiconops Chen, 1939

Synonyms
- Conopilla Rondani, 1856

= Conops =

Genus of flies

Conops is a genus of flies from the family Conopidae. The larvae of Conops are parasitic on bees, especially bumblebees. Adults feed on nectar.

== Species ==
- Subgenus Conops Linnaeus, 1758
  - C. ceriaeformis Meigen, 1824
  - C. flavicaudus (Bigot, 1880)
  - C. flavipes Linnaeus, 1758
  - C. maculatus Macquart, 1834
  - C. quadrifasciatus De Geer, 1776
  - C. rufiventris Macquart, 1849
  - C. silaceus Wiedemann in Meigen, 1824
  - C. scutellatus Meigen, 1804
  - C. strigatus Wiedemann in Meigen, 1824
  - C. vesicularis Linnaeus, 1761
  - C. vitellinus Loew, 1847
- Subgenus Asiconops Chen, 1939
  - C. elegans Meigen, 1824
  - C. flavifrons Meigen, 1824
  - C. insignis Loew, 1848
  - C. longiventris Kröber, 1916
  - C. weinbergae Camras & Chvála, 1984
