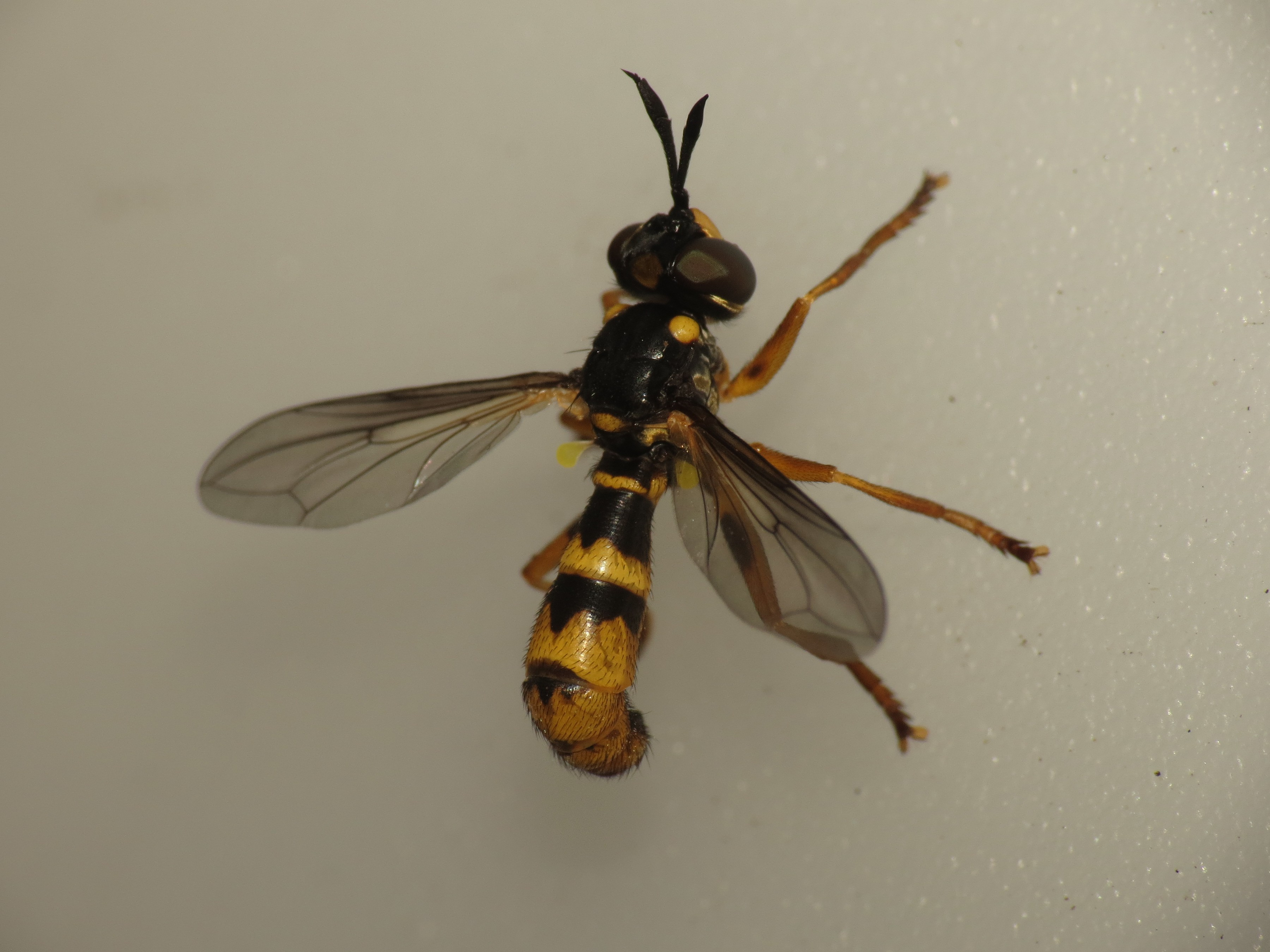

Scientific classification
- Kingdom: Animalia
- Phylum: Arthropoda
- Clade: Pancrustacea
- Class: Insecta
- Order: Diptera
- Family: Conopidae
- Genus: Leopoldius
- Species: L. signatus

Binomial name
- Leopoldius signatus (Wiedemann in Meigen, 1824)

Synonyms
- Conops signatus Wiedemann in Meigen, 1824; Leopoldius erostratus Rondani, 1843

= Leopoldius signatus =

Species of fly

Leopoldius signatus is a species of fly from the genus Leopoldius in the family Conopidae.
