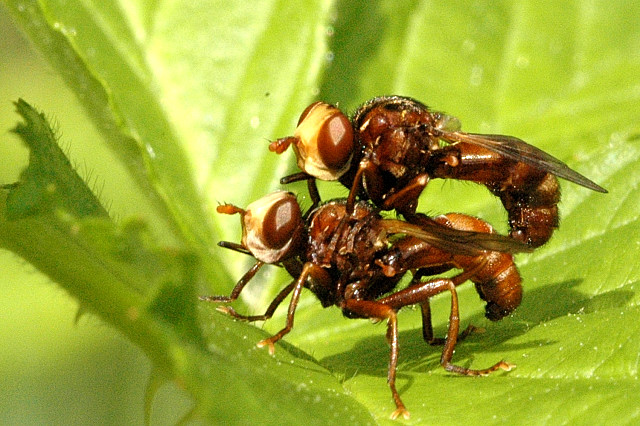
- Sicus ferrugineus in copula

Scientific classification
- Kingdom: Animalia
- Phylum: Arthropoda
- Clade: Pancrustacea
- Class: Insecta
- Order: Diptera
- Family: Conopidae
- Tribe: Sicini
- Genus: Sicus; Scopoli, 1763

Species
- See text

= Sicus =

Genus of flies

Sicus is a genus of flies from the family Conopidae.

== Species ==
- S. abdominalis Kröber, 1915
- S. alpinus Stuke, 2002
- S. caucasicus Zimina, 1963
- S. chvalai Stuke, 2004
- S. ferrugineus (Linnaeus, 1761)
- S. fusenensis Ôuchi, 1939
- S. nigritarsis Zimina, 1975
- S. nishitapensis (Matsumura, 1916)
