= Sicus abdominalis =

Scientific classification
- Kingdom: Animalia
- Phylum: Arthropoda
- Clade: Pancrustacea
- Class: Insecta
- Order: Diptera
- Family: Conopidae
- Genus: Sicus
- Species: S. abdominalis

Binomial name
- Sicus abdominalis Kröber, 1915

Synonyms
- Sicus vaginalis Kröber, 1915

Species of fly

Sicus abdominalis is a species of fly from the genus Sicus in the family Conopidae.
