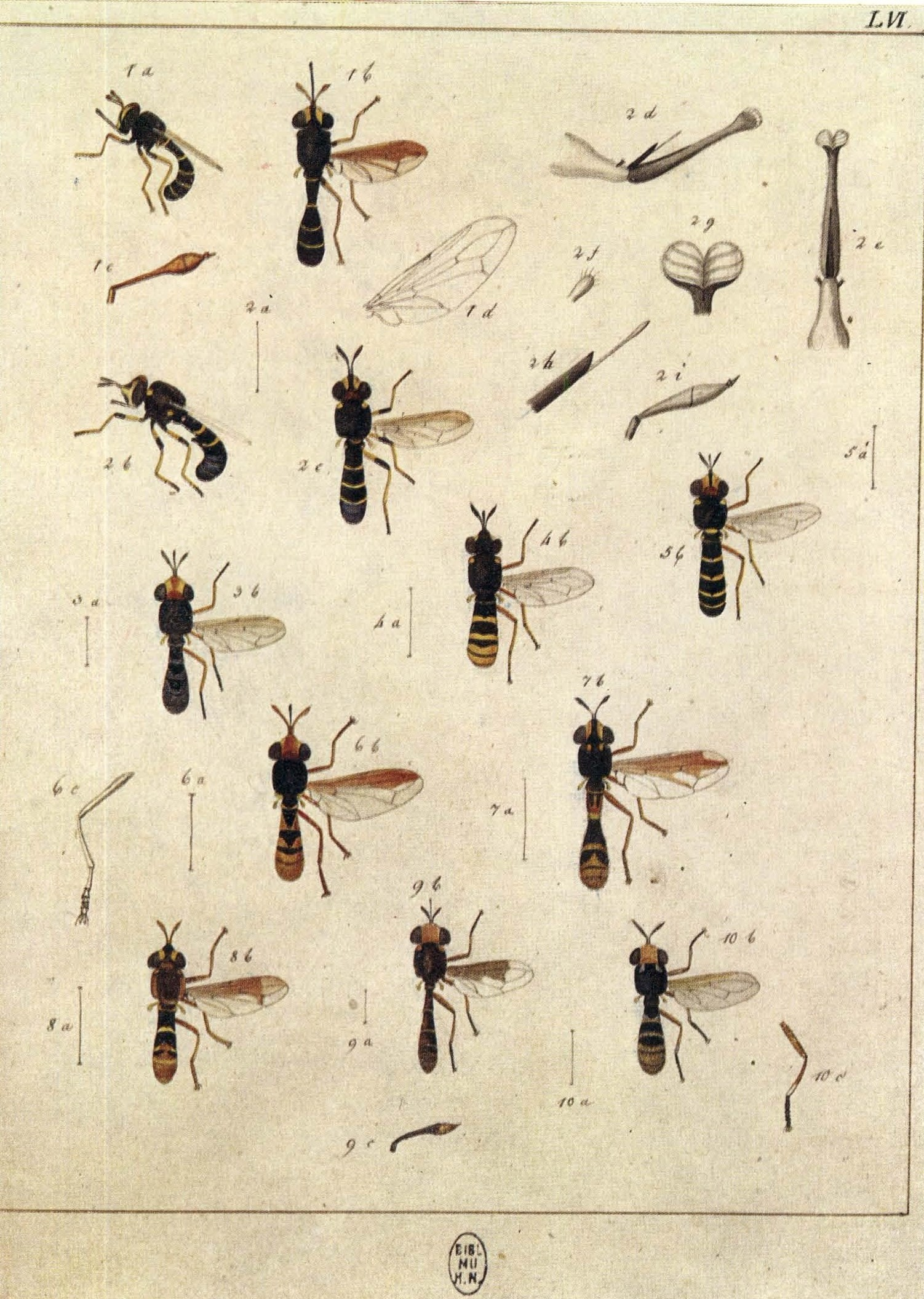
- Conops elegans in Meigen Europäischen Zweiflügeligen

Scientific classification
- Kingdom: Animalia
- Phylum: Arthropoda
- Class: Insecta
- Order: Diptera
- Family: Conopidae
- Genus: Conops
- Species: C. elegans

Binomial name
- Conops elegans Meigen, 1824

Subspecies
- Conops elegans var. fuscipennis Macquart; Conops elegans var. minutus Krober

= Conops elegans =

Species of fly

Conops elegans is a fly species in the genus Conops that can be found in Cyprus, France, and Spain.
