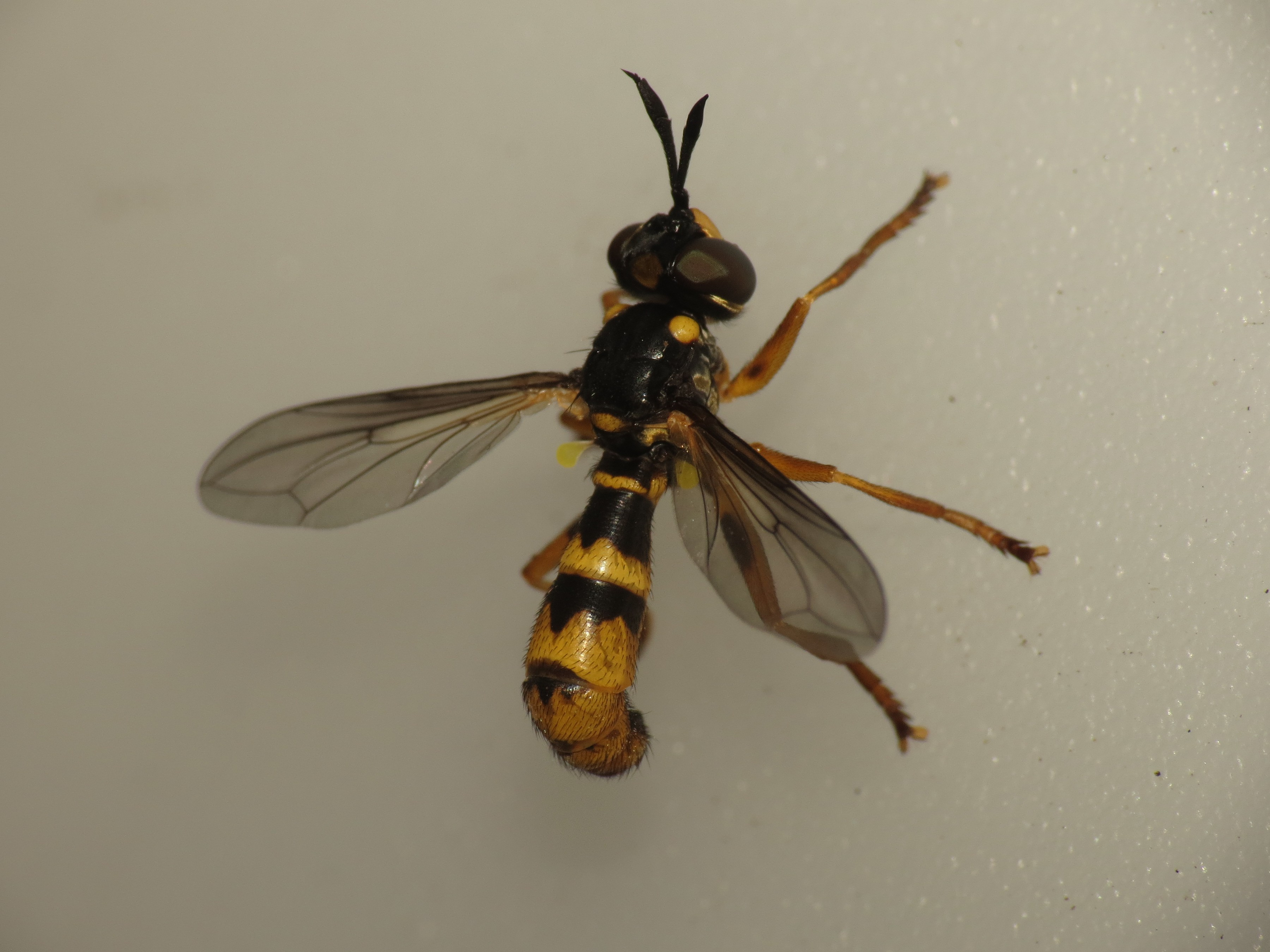
- Leopoldius signatus (Wiedemann in Meigen, 1824)

Scientific classification
- Kingdom: Animalia
- Phylum: Arthropoda
- Clade: Pancrustacea
- Class: Insecta
- Order: Diptera
- Family: Conopidae
- Subfamily: Conopinae
- Tribe: Conopini
- Genus: Leopoldius; Rondani, 1843

Type species
- Leopoldius erostratus Rondani, 1843

Species
- See text

Synonyms
- Brachiglossum Rondani, 1856

= Leopoldius =

Genus of flies

Leopoldius is a genus of flies from the family Conopidae.

== Species ==
- Leopoldius brevirostris (Germar, 1827)
- Leopoldius cabrilsensis Carles-Tolrá, 2000
- Leopoldius calceatus (Rondani, 1857)
- Leopoldius coronatus (Rondani, 1857)
- Leopoldius diadematus Rondani, 1845
- Leopoldius signatus (Wiedemann in Meigen, 1824)
- Leopoldius valvatus Kröber, 1914
