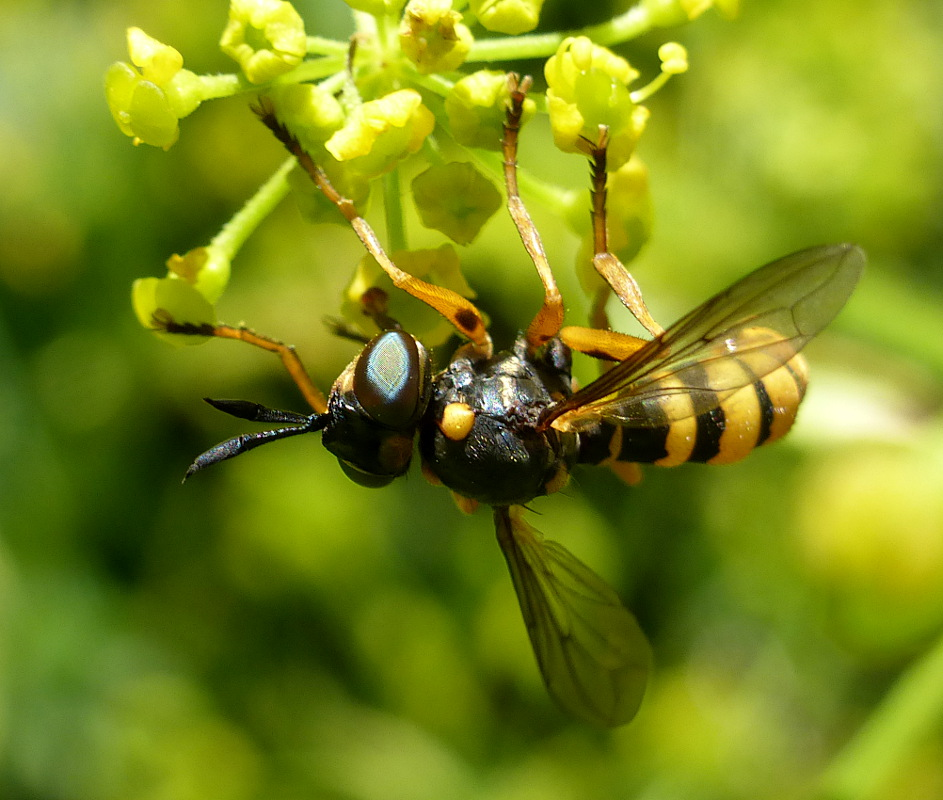

Scientific classification
- Kingdom: Animalia
- Phylum: Arthropoda
- Clade: Pancrustacea
- Class: Insecta
- Order: Diptera
- Family: Conopidae
- Genus: Leopoldius
- Species: L. brevirostris

Binomial name
- Leopoldius brevirostris (Germar, 1827)

Synonyms
- Conops brevirostris Germar, 1827

= Leopoldius brevirostris =

Species of fly

Leopoldius brevirostris is a species of fly from the genus Leopoldius in the family Conopidae.
