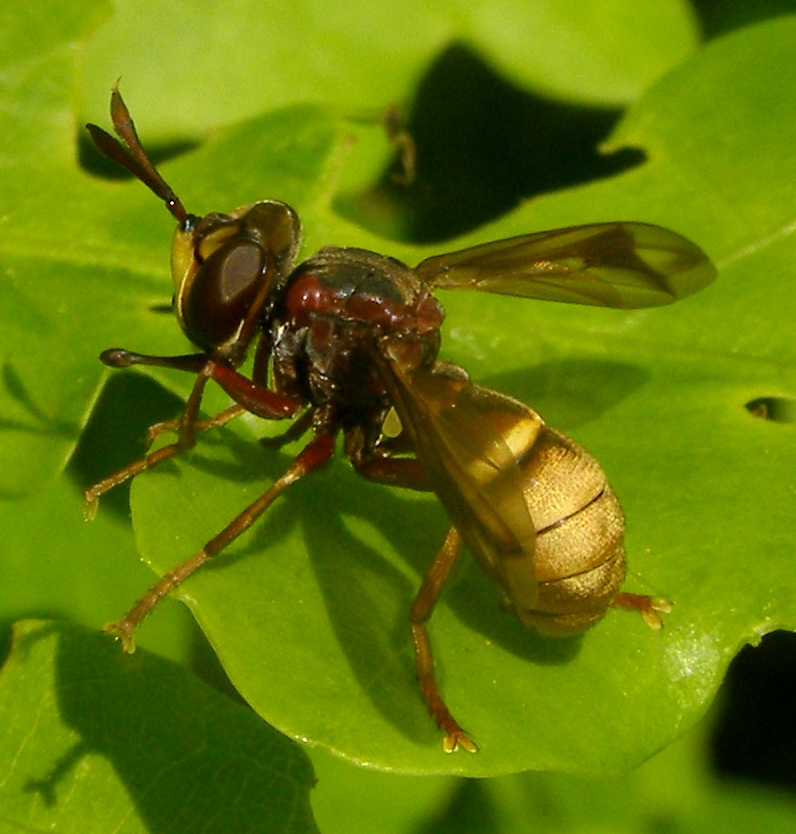

Scientific classification
- Kingdom: Animalia
- Phylum: Arthropoda
- Clade: Pancrustacea
- Class: Insecta
- Order: Diptera
- Family: Conopidae
- Genus: Conops
- Species: C. vesicularis

Binomial name
- Conops vesicularis Linnaeus, 1761

= Conops vesicularis =

Species of fly

Conops vesicularis is a species of fly from the genus Conops in the family Conopidae. Their larvae are endoparasites of bees and wasps. The species is native to Europe.
