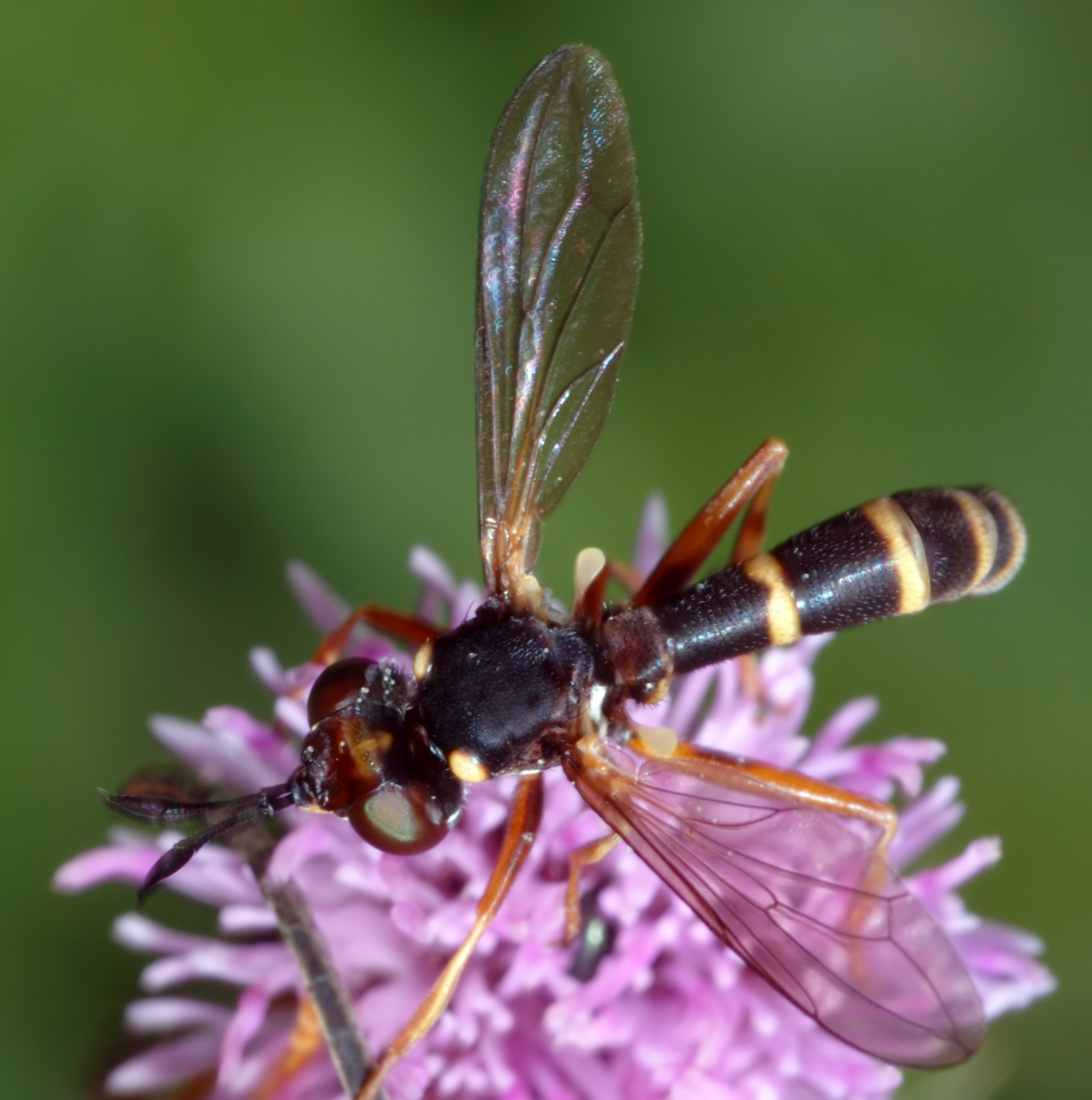

Scientific classification
- Kingdom: Animalia
- Phylum: Arthropoda
- Clade: Pancrustacea
- Class: Insecta
- Order: Diptera
- Family: Conopidae
- Genus: Conops
- Species: C. quadrifasciatus

Binomial name
- Conops quadrifasciatus De Geer, 1776

Synonyms
- Conops macrocephala Harris, 1776; Conops terminatus Macquart, 1834; Conops triangulifer Szilady, 1926

= Conops quadrifasciatus =

Species of fly

Conops quadrifasciatus, the yellow-banded conops, is a species of fly from the genus Conops in the family Conopidae.

== Distribution and habitat ==
This species is common throughout much of Europe. It is also present in Russia, Turkey and Iran. These conopids can be found mainly on rough flowery places, on meadows and on roadsides.

== Description ==
Female on a blossom of blackberry (video, 1m 20s)

Conops quadrifasciatus can reach a length of 10–15 millimetres (0.39–0.59 in).These wasp-like conopids have a black head and body. The abdomen is basically black with a vivid yellow bands. Face is yellow, but above antennal implant is black, and the area containing the ocelli has the same colour as the eyes. The antennae are black. It has a long proboscis. Thorax and scutellum are black. The posterior margins of the first four segments of the abdomen are yellow, the fifth segment is yellow. Tergite 1-3 are mainly black. The legs are yellow-brown. Femurs 2 and 3 are uniformly pale, sometimes with a small darkened spot. In males tergite is 5 black with broad yellow band at hind border. Females show a slimmer physique and have under the 5th abdominal segment a brownish-yellow, rounded pouch (theca), slightly hooked downward at the apex. This species is rather similar to Conops ceriaeformis.

== Biology ==
Adults behave like solitary wasps. They fly from June to September and feed on nectar and pollen of flowers, mainly of Chamerion angustifolium (Onagraceae), Heracleum sphondylium (Apiaceae), Leucanthemum vulgare, Cirsium arvense, Senecio nemorensis (Asteraceae), Valeriana, and Lamiaceae species.

Their larvae are endoparasites of bumble bees of the genus Bombus, especially Bombus lapidarius. The females pounce the bumblebees and lay an egg between the tergites by means of the hooked abdomen.

== Gallery ==
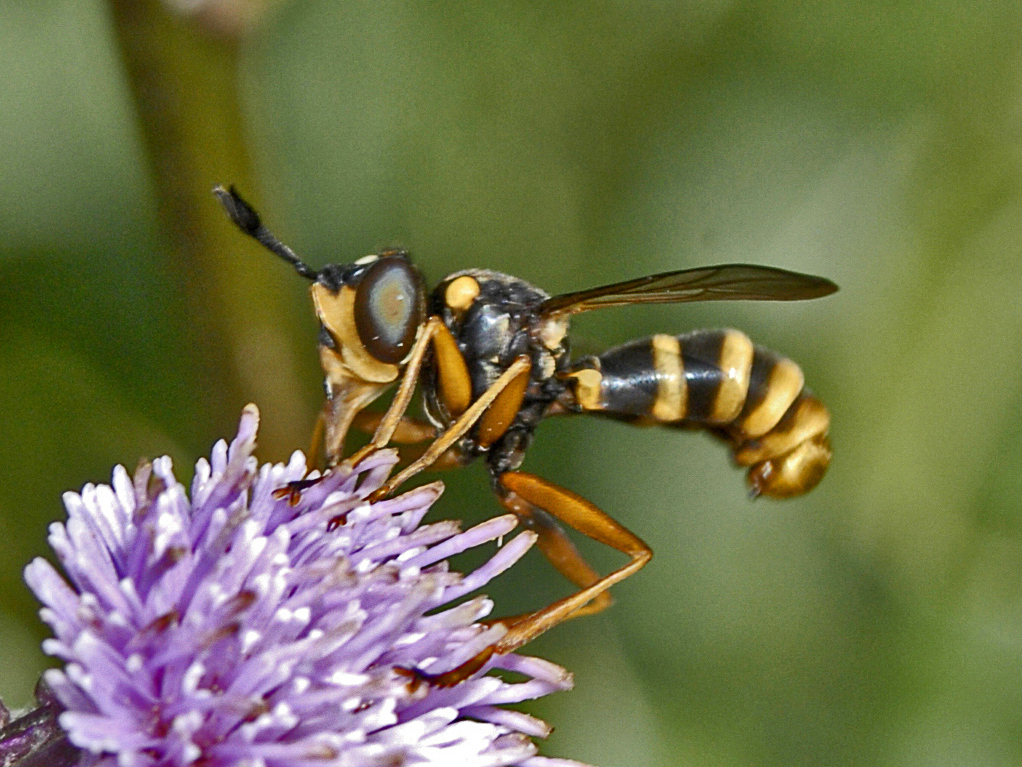
Male

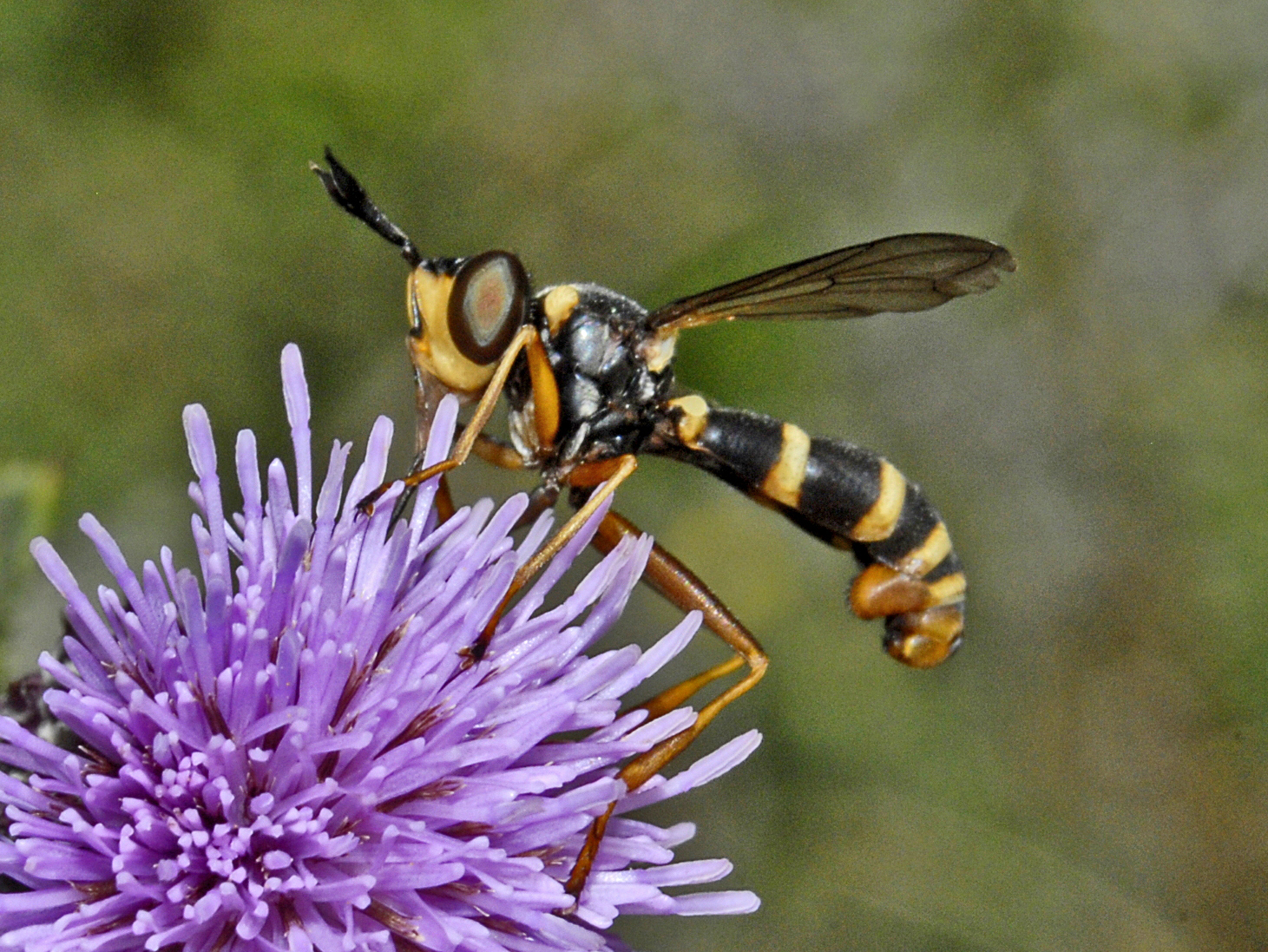
Female

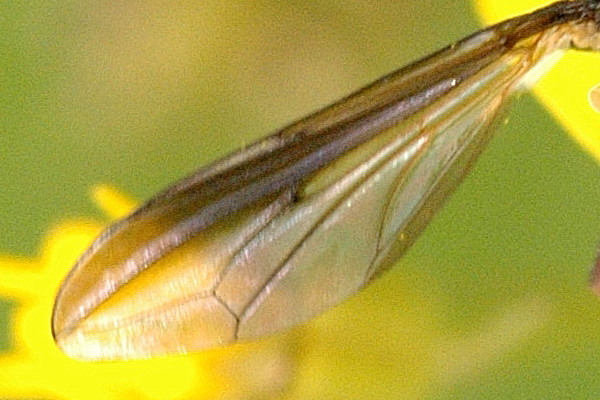
Wing details
