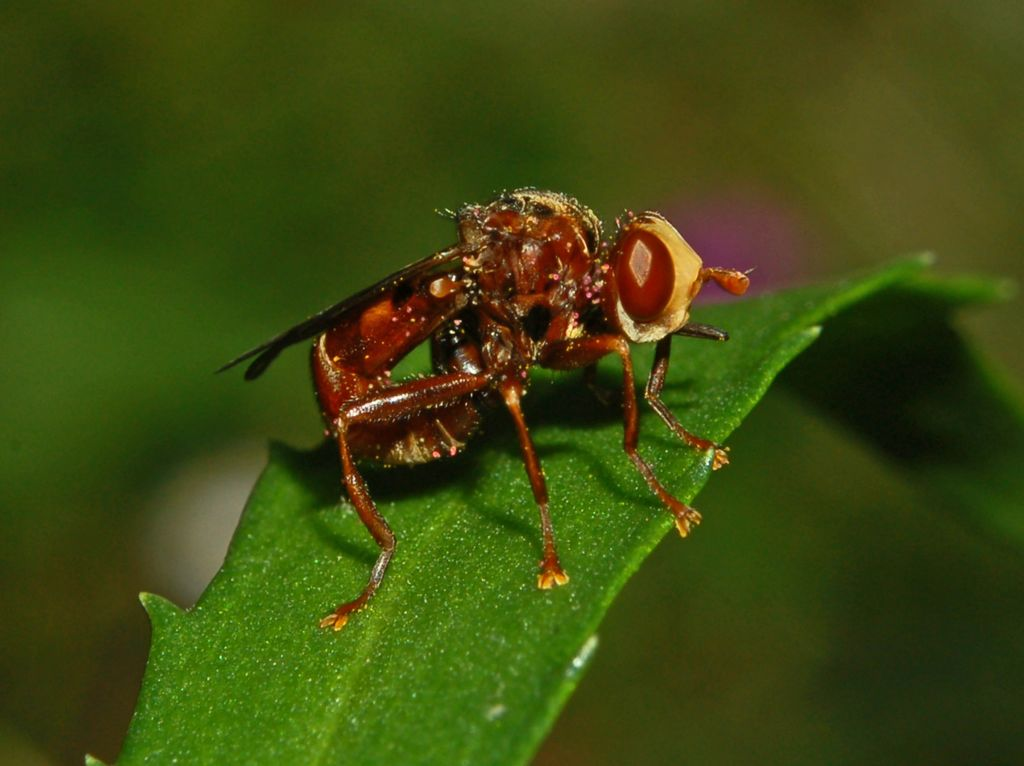
- Sicus ferrugineus. Female, side view
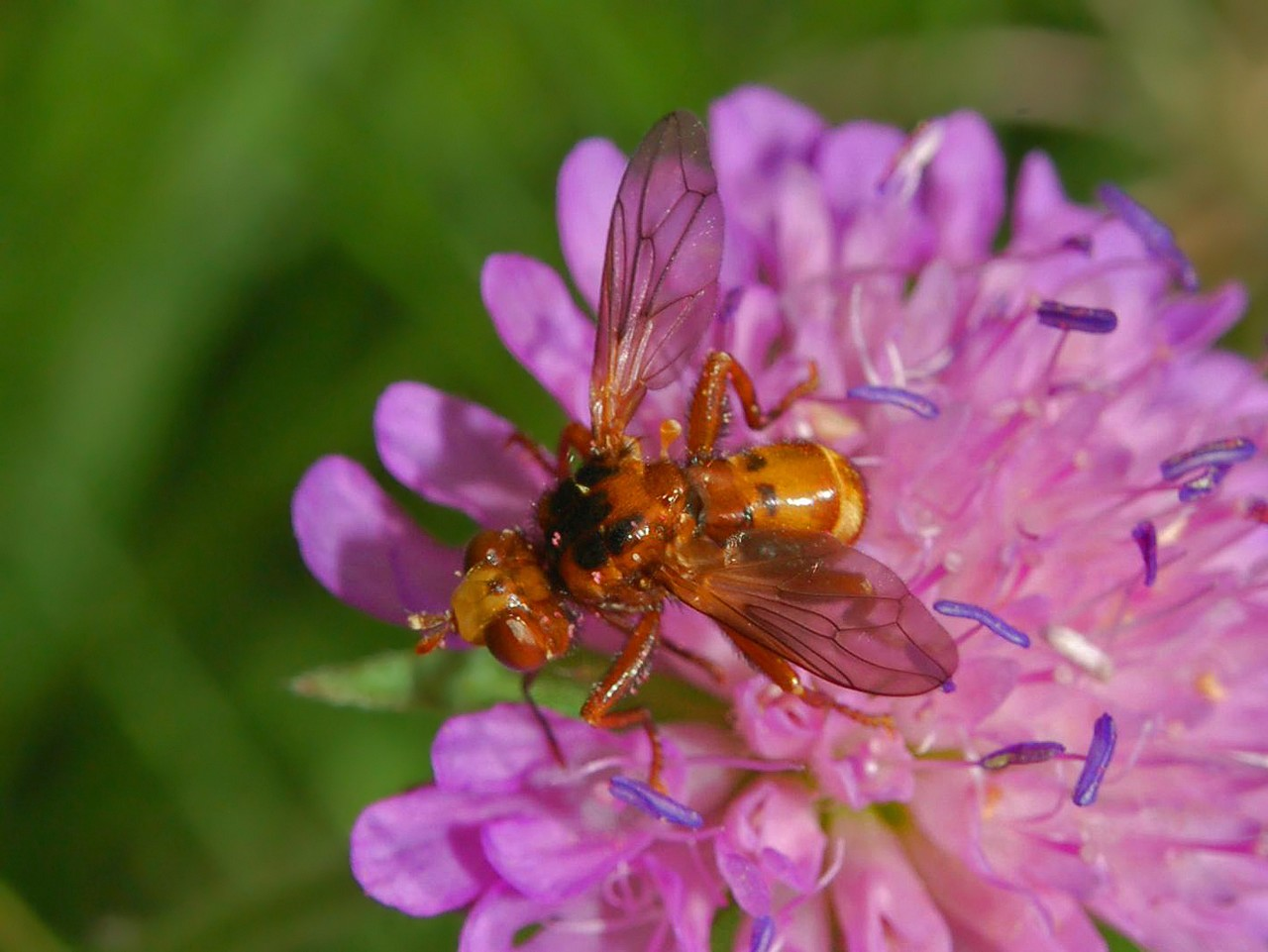
- Dorsal view

Scientific classification
- Kingdom: Animalia
- Phylum: Arthropoda
- Clade: Pancrustacea
- Class: Insecta
- Order: Diptera
- Family: Conopidae
- Genus: Sicus
- Species: S. ferrugineus

Binomial name
- Sicus ferrugineus (Linnaeus, 1761)

Synonyms
- List: Conops cessans Harris, 1776; Conops ferrugineus Linnaeus, 1761; Sicus cessans (Harris, 1776); Myopa annulipes Robineau-Desvoidy, 1830; Sicus ferrugineus Scopoli, 1763

= Sicus ferrugineus =

Species of fly

Sicus ferrugineus is a species of fly from the genus Sicus in the family Conopidae.

== Distribution and habitat ==
This species is common throughout much of Europe. These conopids mainly inhabit hedgerows and flower meadows.

== Description ==
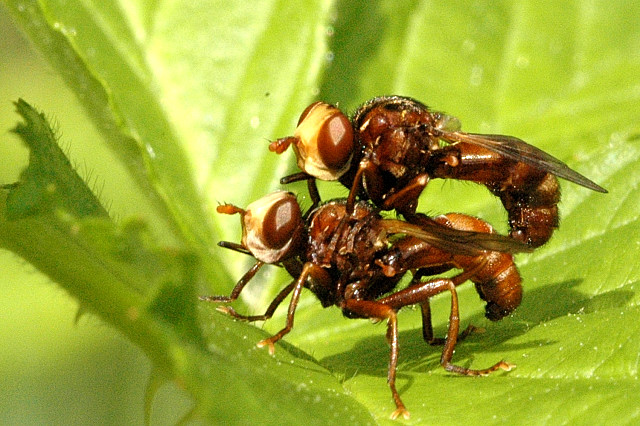
Sicus ferrugineus in copula

The adults grow up to 8–13 millimetres (0.31–0.51 in) long. The body is mainly reddish-brown or yellow-brown. The head is yellow, quite large and inflated-looking, with a kind of bubble at the front and narrow cheeks. The short antennae are brown, their second segment has the same length or it is longer than the third. The large eyes are reddish. The legs and also the last abdomen segments are often darkened. The abdomen is long, round in cross-section, the seventh segment is oblong and conical. When in resting position the abdomen is usually folded forward. In the females theca is hardly distinguishable. The wings are transparent, but reddish-yellow colored at the base.

== Biology ==
They can be encountered from May through September, feeding on nectar or pollen of various Asteraceae species (Hieracium pilosella, Thistle, Cirsium species, etc.), Apiaceae species (Parsley Petroselinum sp, . Heracleum sphondylium), Onagraceae (Chamerion angustifolium), Lamiaceae (Teucrium scorodonia) and Rosaceae species (Blackberries, Rubus fruticosus sp.).

Their larvae are endoparasites of bumble bees of the genus Bombus (B. lapidarius, B. terrestris , B. hortorum, B. pascuorum, etc.). They pupate and overwinter in their victims.

Video clips. Sicus ferrugineus in copula

== Bibliography ==
- Joachim & Hiroko Haupt: Fliegen und Mücken: Beobachtung, Lebensweise. Naturbuch-Verlag, Augsburg 1998, ISBN 3-89440-278-4.
- Kurt Kormann: Schwebfliegen und Blasenkopffliegen Mitteleuropas. Fauna Verlag, Nottuln 2003, ISBN 3-935980-29-9.
- Marion Kotrba The internal female reproductive tract of Sicus ferrugineus (Linnaeus, 1761) (Diptera, Conopidae)
