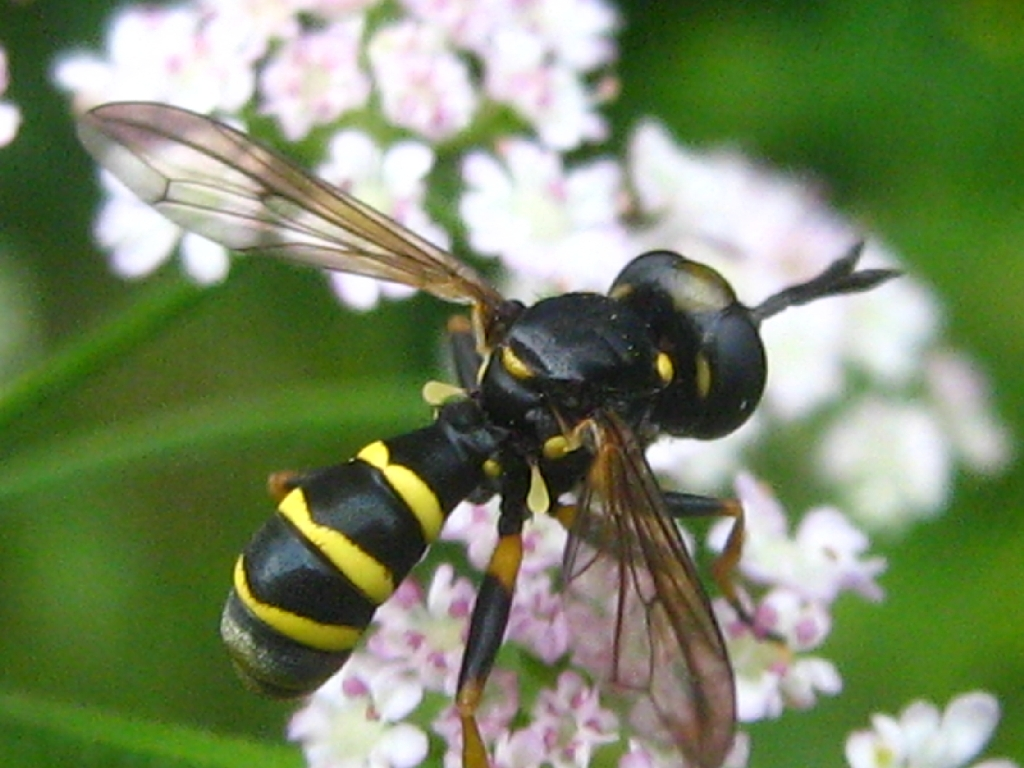

Scientific classification
- Kingdom: Animalia
- Phylum: Arthropoda
- Clade: Pancrustacea
- Class: Insecta
- Order: Diptera
- Family: Conopidae
- Genus: Conops
- Species: C. flavipes

Binomial name
- Conops flavipes Linnaeus, 1758

Synonyms
- Conops melanocephala Meigen, 1804

= Conops flavipes =

Species of fly

Conops flavipes is a species of fly from the genus Conops in the family Conopidae. Their larvae are endoparasites of bumble bees of the genus Bombus. It is common throughout much of Europe.
