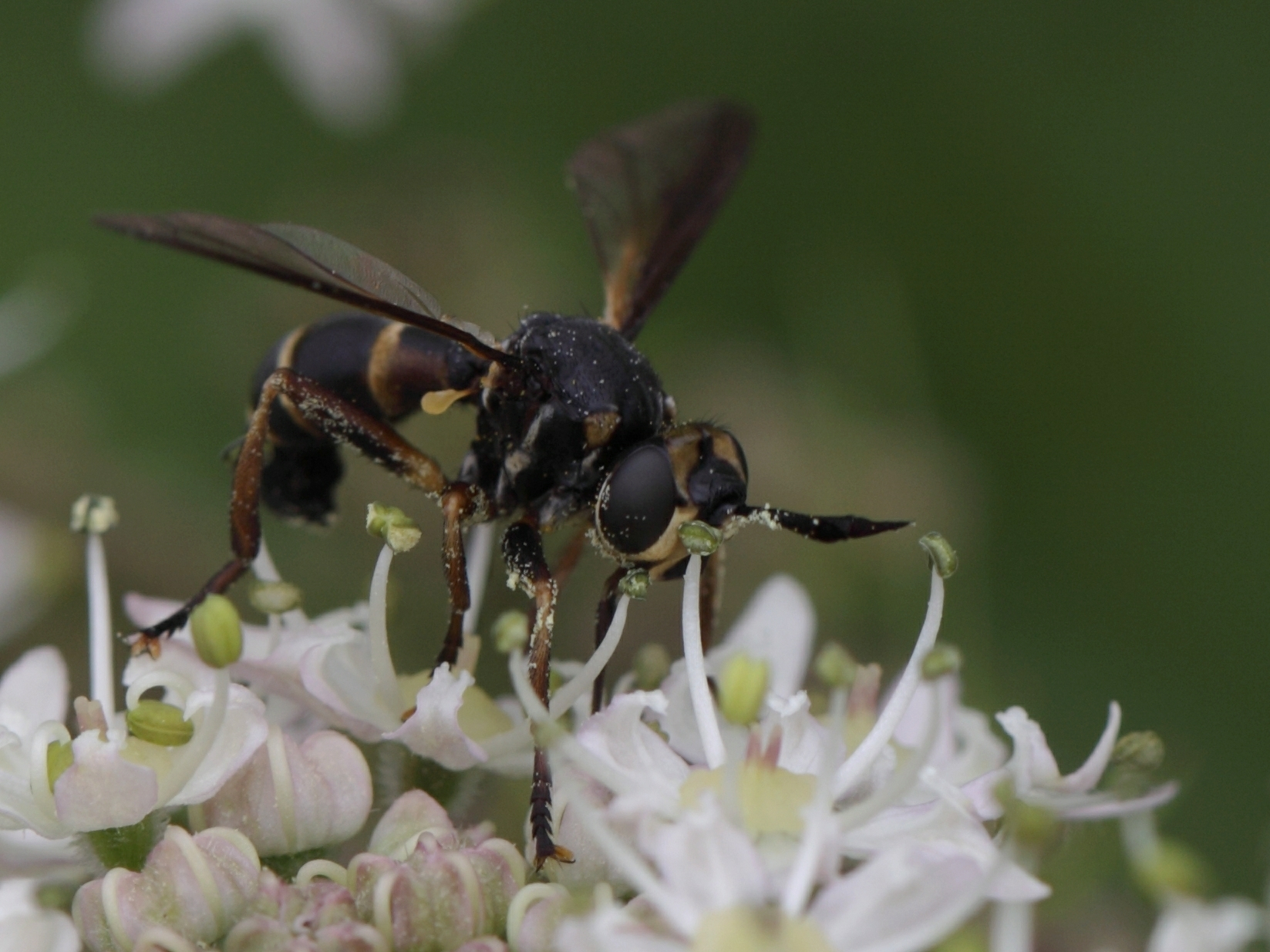

Scientific classification
- Kingdom: Animalia
- Phylum: Arthropoda
- Clade: Pancrustacea
- Class: Insecta
- Order: Diptera
- Family: Conopidae
- Genus: Conops
- Species: C. strigatus

Binomial name
- Conops strigatus Wiedemann in Meigen, 1824

= Conops strigatus =

Species of fly

Conops strigatus is a species of fly from the genus Conops in the family Conopidae. Their larvae are endoparasites of bees and wasps. The fly is scarce in the United Kingdom.
