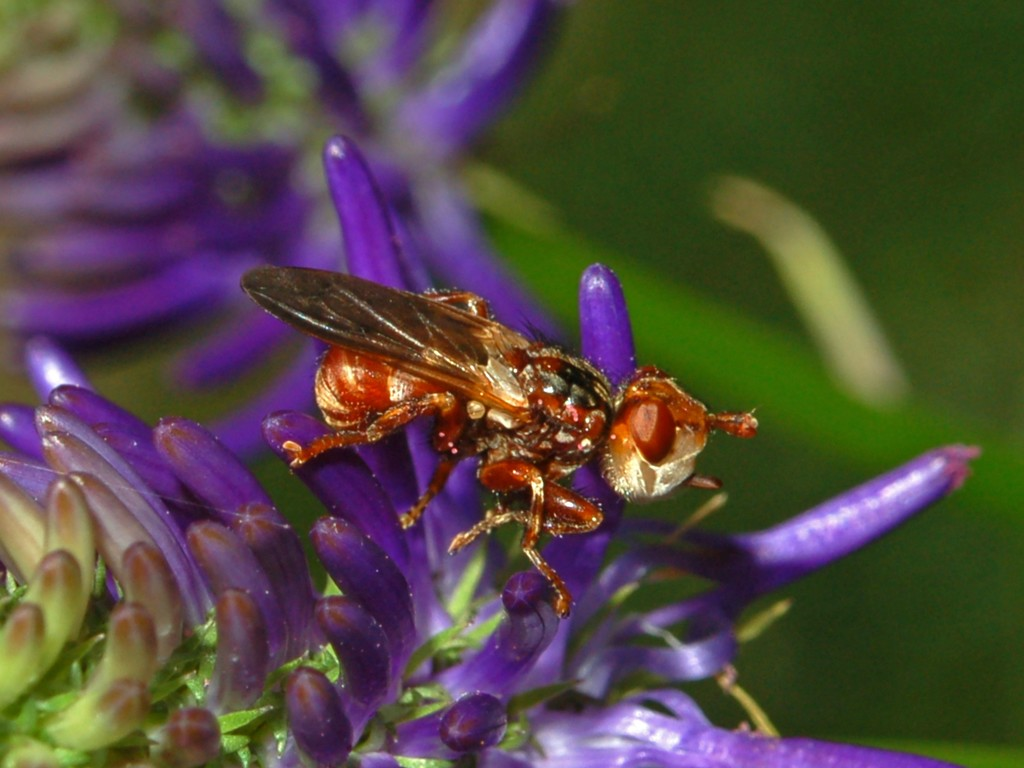
- Myopa dorsalis. Side view

Scientific classification
- Kingdom: Animalia
- Phylum: Arthropoda
- Class: Insecta
- Order: Diptera
- Family: Conopidae
- Subfamily: Myopinae
- Tribe: Myopini
- Genus: Myopa
- Species: M. dorsalis

Binomial name
- Myopa dorsalis Fabricius, 1794

Synonyms
- Conops testacea Gmelin, 1790; Myopa grandis Meigen, 1804; Myopa nigrifacies Becker, 1922; Purpurella nobilis Robineau-Desvoidy, 1853

= Myopa dorsalis =

Species of fly

Myopa dorsalis is a species belonging to the family Conopidae subfamily Myopinae.

== Distribution ==
Myopa dorsalis is present in most of Europe (Austria, Belgium, Bulgaria, Czech Republic, Denmark, France, Germany, Italy, Poland, Romania, Slovakia, Spain, The Netherlands and in Switzerland). This species can also be found from North Africa to India and in Iran.

== Description ==
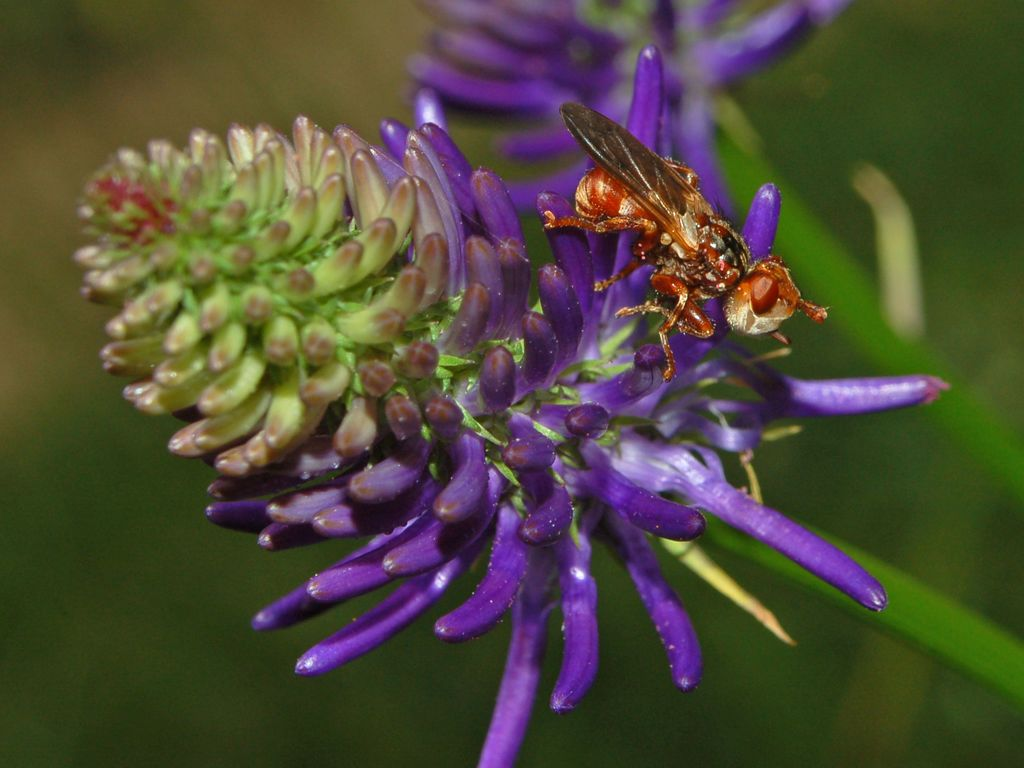
Myopa dorsalis on Phyteuma orbiculare

Myopa dorsalis can reach a length of 11.5–15 millimetres (0.45–0.59 in). This fly is one of the biggest European conopids and it is not a very common insect, likewise almost all conopids. The body is mainly reddish-brown, mesonotum is black, while scutellum is reddish. The head is quite large and inflated-looking, with a kind of bubble at the front and short antennae, the snout is elongated with narrow white cheeks. The large eyes are reddish. The abdomen is reddish brown and it is usually folded forward when the fly is in resting position. Tergites 4 and 5 are largely dusted. Legs are completely yellowish brown. Wings are hyaline, without black markings. It can be distinguished from Sicus species by its longer cheeks.

== Biology ==
The adults can be encountered feeding on nectar of many species of flowering plants. Their larvae are endoparasites of Hymenoptera aculeata.
