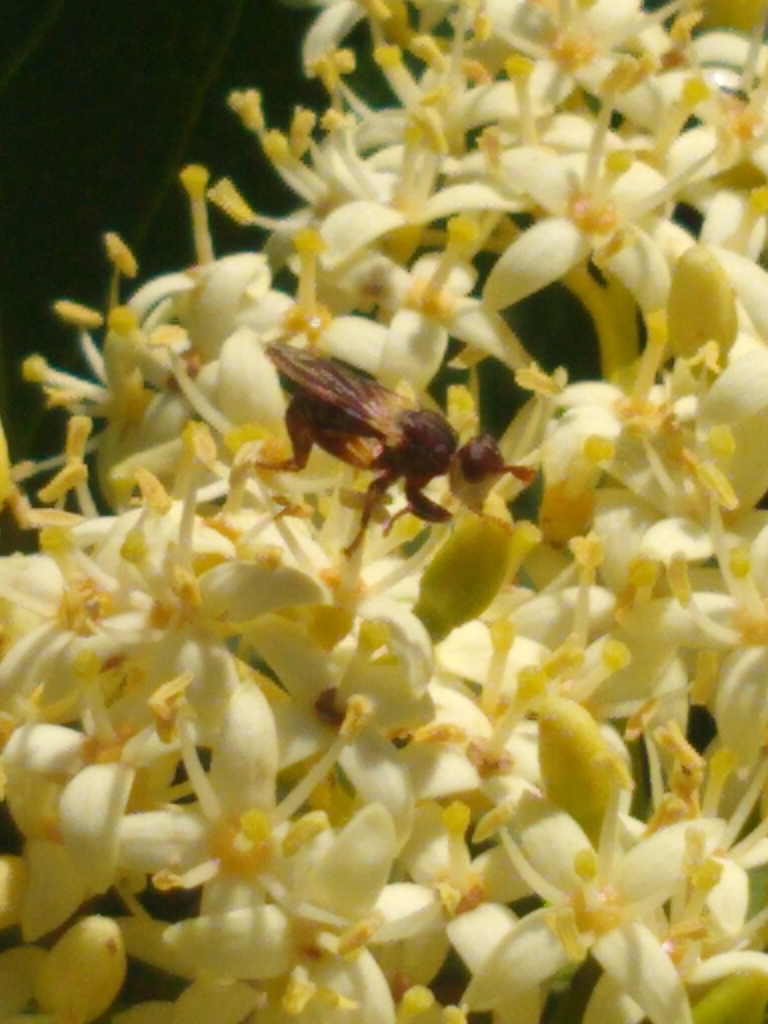

Scientific classification
- Kingdom: Animalia
- Phylum: Arthropoda
- Class: Insecta
- Order: Diptera
- Family: Conopidae
- Subfamily: Myopinae
- Tribe: Myopini
- Genus: Myopa
- Species: M. clausa

Binomial name
- Myopa clausa Loew, 1866

= Myopa clausa =

Species of fly

Myopa clausa is a species of thick-headed flies in the family Conopidae.

== Distribution ==
Canada, United States.
