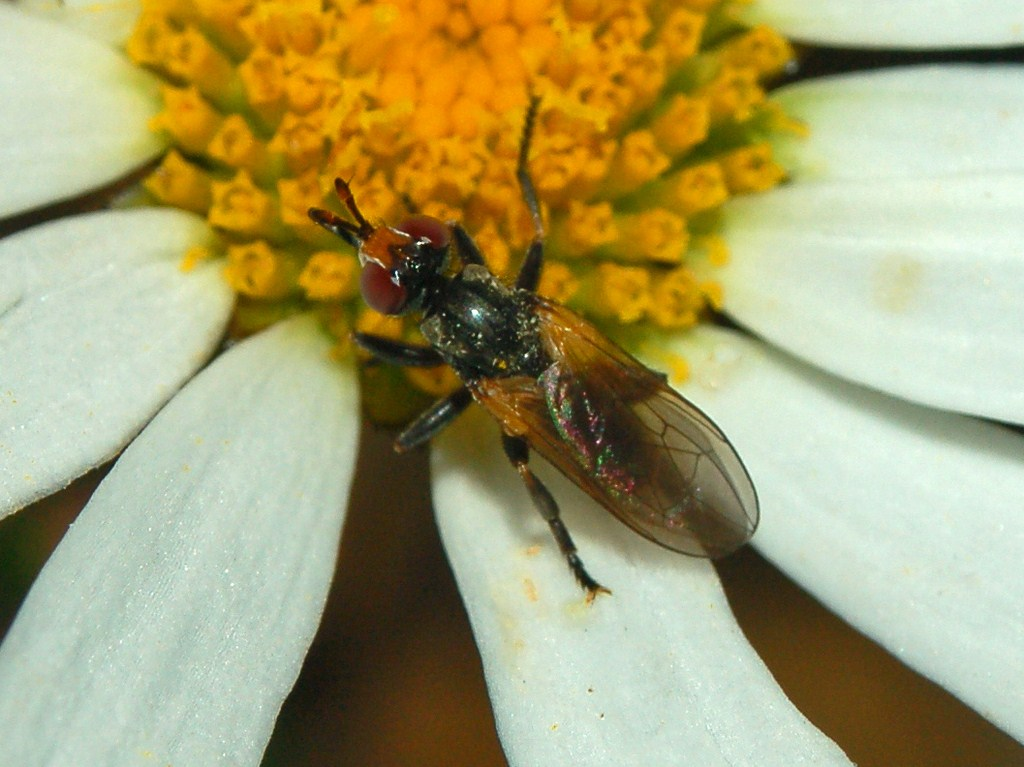
- Thecophora cf. atra

Scientific classification
- Kingdom: Animalia
- Phylum: Arthropoda
- Class: Insecta
- Order: Diptera
- Family: Conopidae
- Genus: Thecophora
- Species: T. atra

Binomial name
- Thecophora atra (Fabricius, 1775)

= Thecophora atra =

Species of fly

Thecophora atra is a species of small fly in the family Conopidae subfamily Myopinae.

This species is mainly present in Belgium, British Isles, France, Germany, Italy, Poland, Portugal, Spain and Switzerland.

Thorax and abdomen of this very small conopid is mainly greyish-black. The head is quite large, the snout is elongated with narrow white cheeks, the large eyes are reddish, the second segment of antennae is much longer than the third and femur 1 and 2 are brown or black, while femur 3 is yellowish on its basal half.

The adults of this fly grow up to 5–6 millimetres (0.20–0.24 in) long and can be encountered from May through October feeding on nectar of Asteraceae species, mainly of Crepis biennis and Leucanthemum species.

Their larvae are endoparasites of small solitary bees, probably of the genus Halictus and Lasioglossum (Halictidae species).
