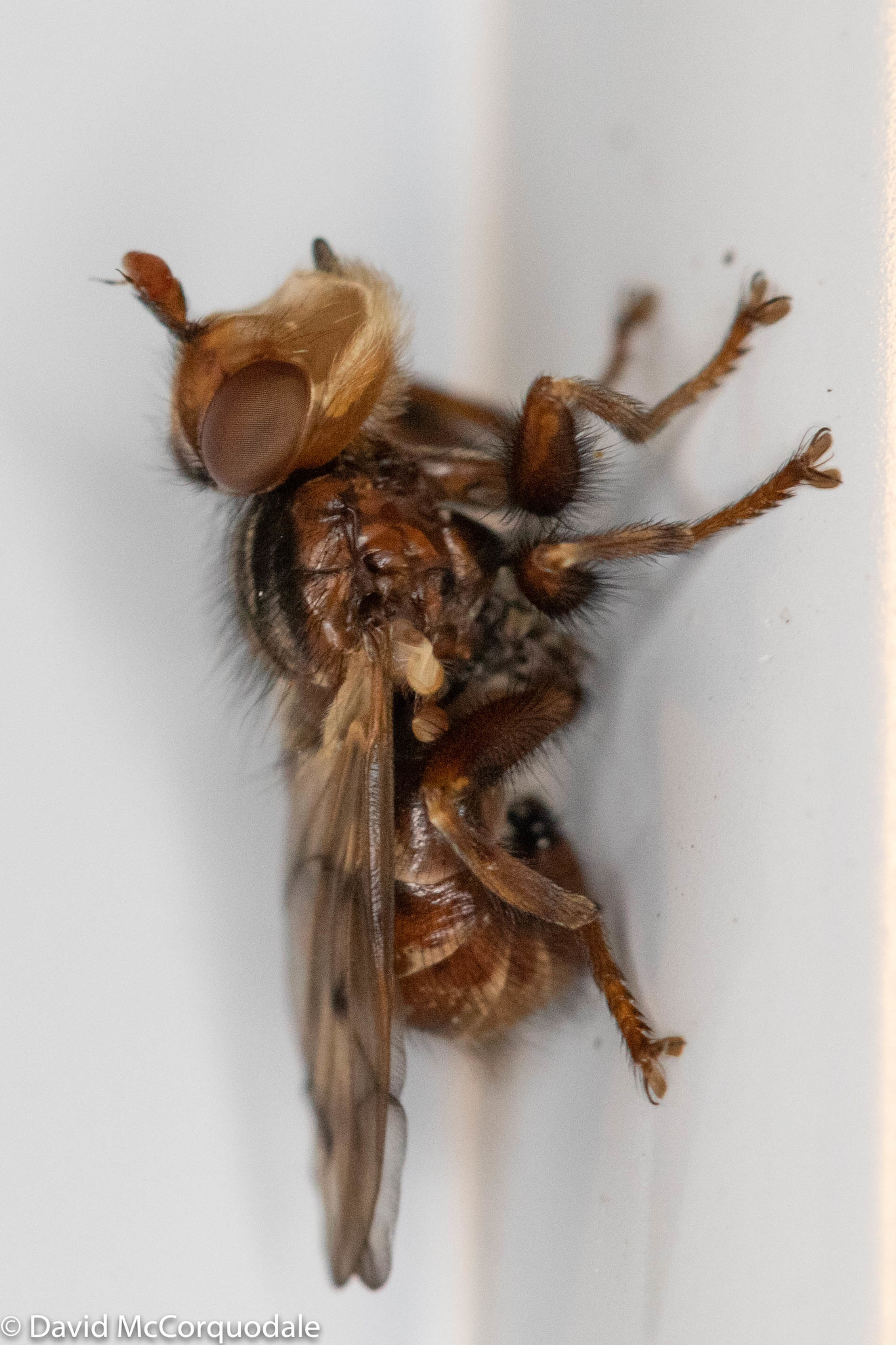

Scientific classification
- Kingdom: Animalia
- Phylum: Arthropoda
- Class: Insecta
- Order: Diptera
- Family: Conopidae
- Genus: Myopa
- Species: M. vicaria

Binomial name
- Myopa vicaria Walker, 1849

Synonyms
- Myopa pilosa Williston, 1885

= Myopa vicaria =

Species of fly

Myopa vicaria is a species of thick-headed flies in the family Conopidae.
