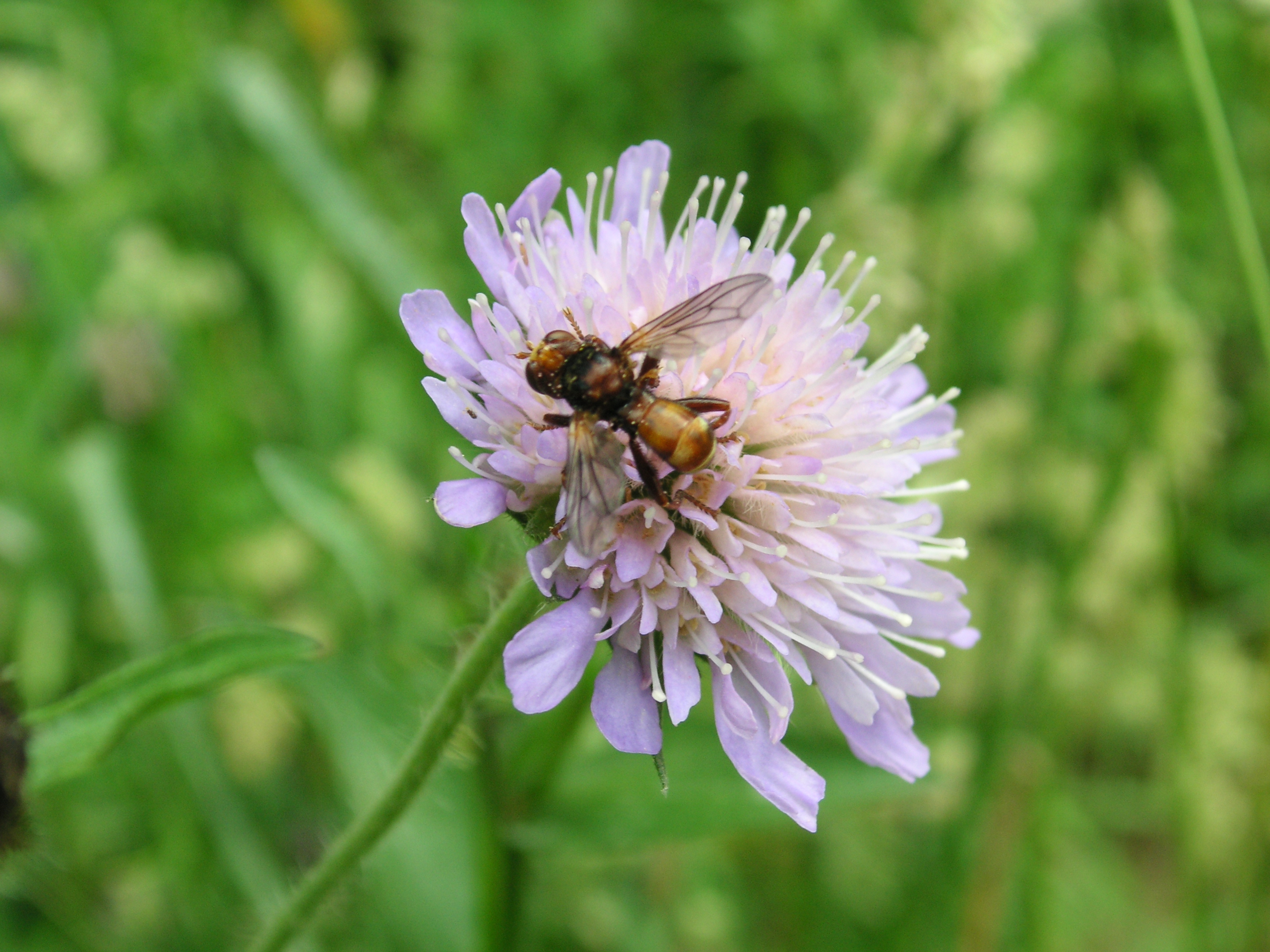
- Myopa buccata

Scientific classification
- Kingdom: Animalia
- Phylum: Arthropoda
- Clade: Pancrustacea
- Class: Insecta
- Order: Diptera
- Family: Conopidae
- Tribe: Myopini
- Genus: Myopa; Fabricius, 1775

Type species
- Conops buccatus Linnaeus, 1758

= Myopa =

Genus of flies

Myopa is a genus of flies from the family Conopidae.

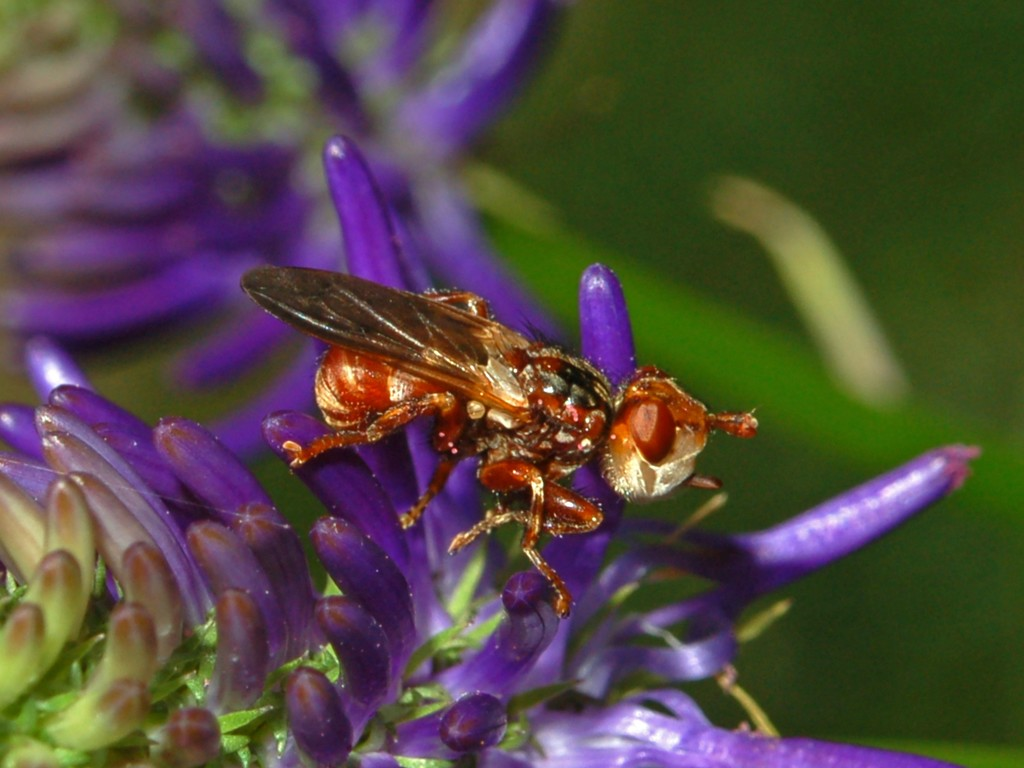
Myopa dorsalis

They are parasitic on honey bees Apis mellifera, also Andrena, and mustache bees Anthophora.

== Species ==
- M. bohartorum Camras, 1953
- M. bozinovici Barahona-Segovia 2020
- M. buccata (Linnaeus, 1758)
- M. castanea (Bigot, 1887)
- M. clausa Loew, 1866
- M. curticornis Kröber, 1916
- M. curtirostris Kröber, 1916
- M. dorsalis Fabricius, 1794
- M. extricata Collin, 1960
- M. fasciata Meigen, 1804
- M. fenestrata Coquillett, 1902
- M. flavopilosa Kröber, 1916
- M. longipilis Banks, 1916
- M. melanderi Banks, 1916
- M. metallica Camra, 1992
- M. minor Strobl, 1906
- M. mixta Frey, 1958
- M. morio Meigen, 1804
- M. nebulosa Barahona-Segovia 2020
- M. occulta Wiedemann in Meigen, 1824
- M. perplexa Camras, 1953
- M. picta Panzer, 1798
- M. plebeia Williston, 1885
- M. polystigma Rondani, 1857
- M. rubida (Bigot, 1887)
- M. stigma Meigen, 1824
- M. strandi Duda, 1940
- M. tessellatipennis Motschulsky, 1859
- M. testacea (Linnaeus, 1767)
- M. variegata Meigen, 1804
- M. vesiculosa Say, 1823
- M. vicaria Walker, 1849
- M. virginica Banks, 1916
