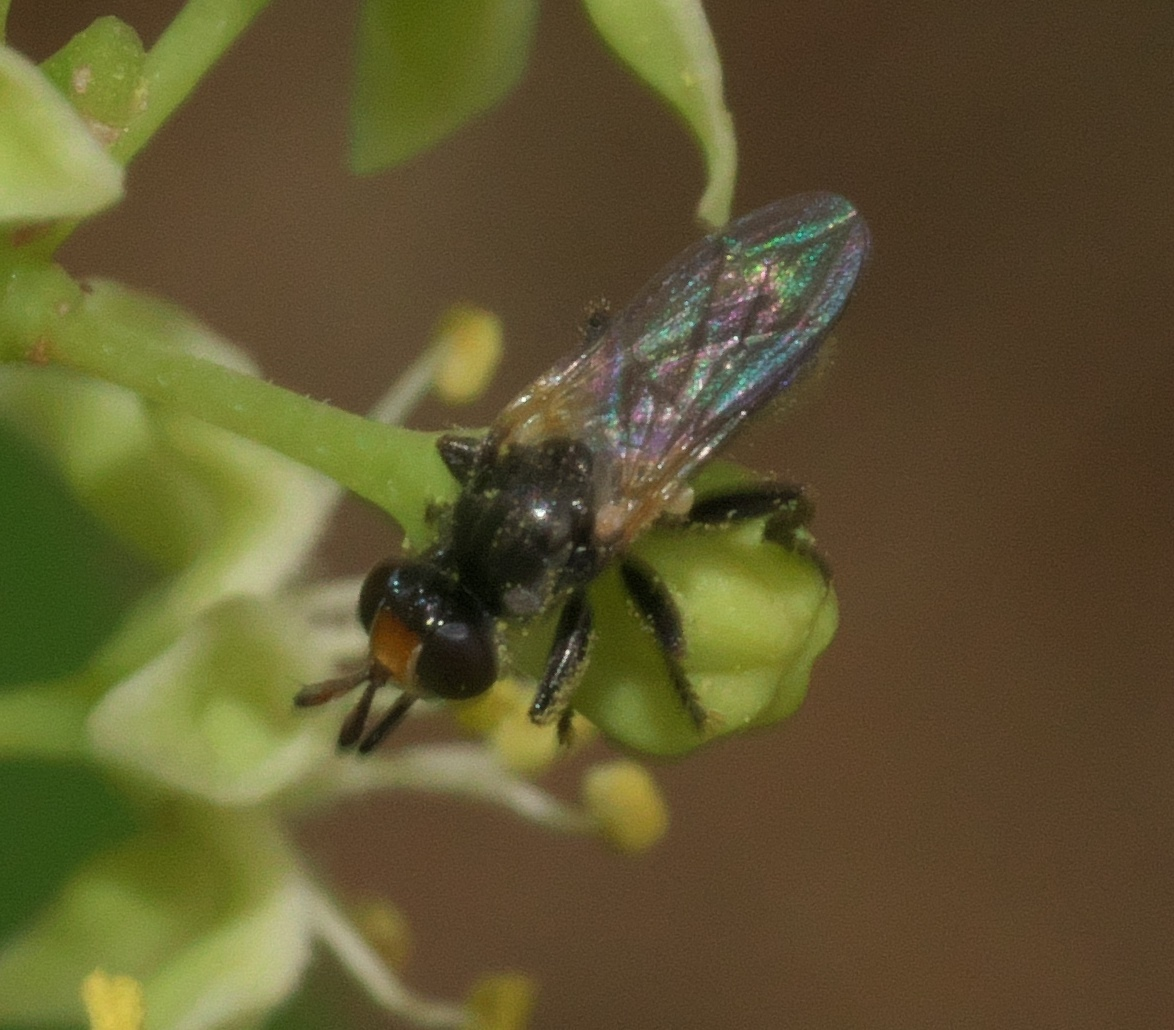
- Thecophora propinqua, California

Scientific classification
- Domain: Eukaryota
- Kingdom: Animalia
- Phylum: Arthropoda
- Class: Insecta
- Order: Diptera
- Family: Conopidae
- Genus: Thecophora
- Species: T. propinqua

Binomial name
- Thecophora propinqua (Adams, 1903)

Synonyms
- Oncomyia angusticornis Van Duzee, 1927; Oncomyia longipalpis Van Duzee, 1934; Oncomyia propinqua Adams, 1903; Zodion angusticornis Van Duzee, 1927

= Thecophora propinqua =

Species of fly

Thecophora propinqua is a species of thick-headed flies, insects in the family Conopidae.
