= Zodion intermedium =

Scientific classification
- Kingdom: Animalia
- Phylum: Arthropoda
- Class: Insecta
- Order: Diptera
- Family: Conopidae
- Genus: Zodion
- Species: Z. intermedium

Binomial name
- Zodion intermedium Banks, 1916

Synonyms
- Zodion occidentale Banks, 1916

Species of fly

Zodion intermedium is a species of thick-headed flies in the family Conopidae.
