= Zodion americanum =

Scientific classification
- Domain: Eukaryota
- Kingdom: Animalia
- Phylum: Arthropoda
- Class: Insecta
- Order: Diptera
- Family: Conopidae
- Genus: Zodion
- Species: Z. americanum

Binomial name
- Zodion americanum Wiedemann, 1830

Synonyms
- Zodion albifacies Van Duzee, 1927; Zodion nanellum Loew, 1866; Zodion pygmaeum Williston, 1885

Species of fly

Zodion americanum is a species of thick-headed fly in the family Conopidae.
