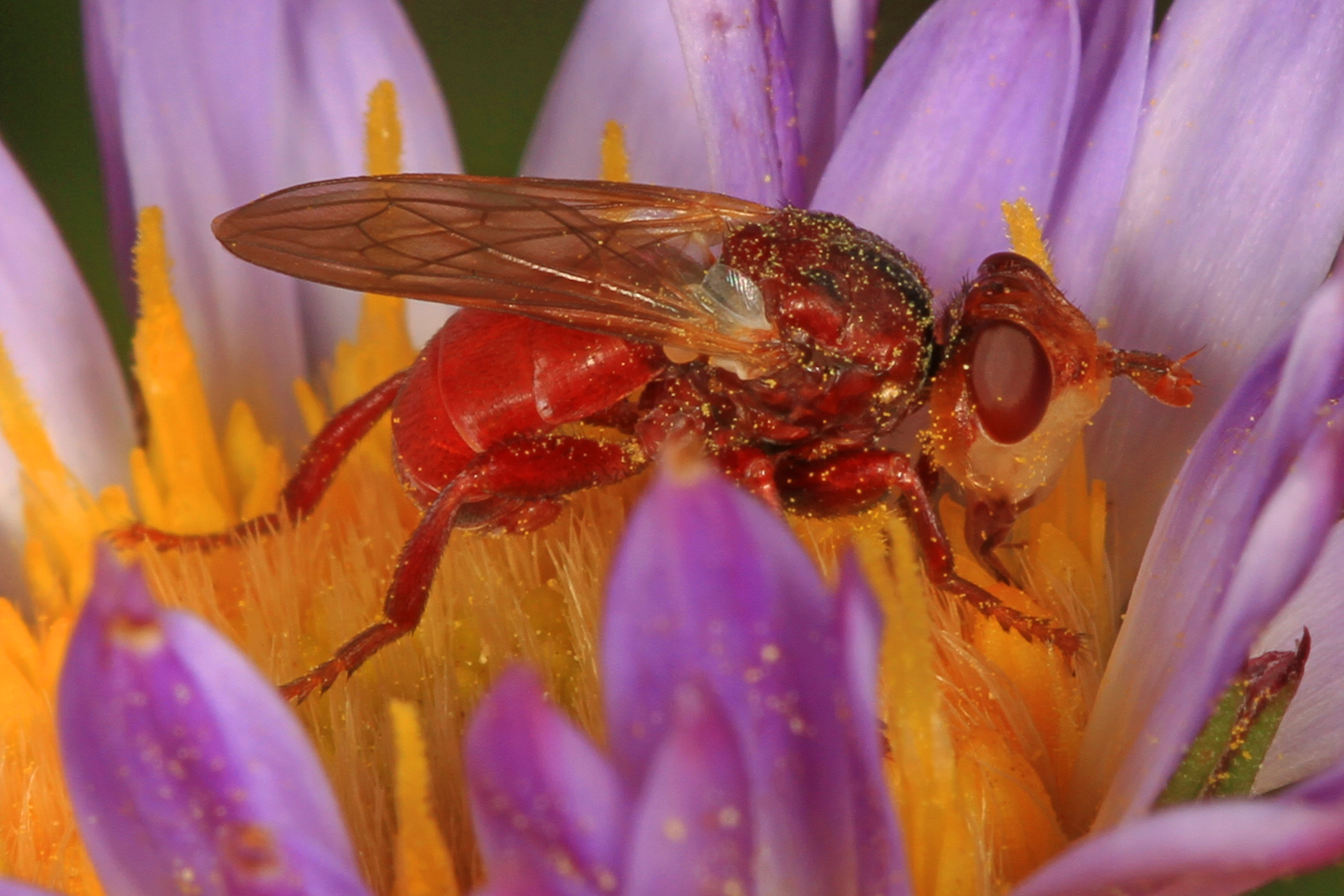

Scientific classification
- Kingdom: Animalia
- Phylum: Arthropoda
- Class: Insecta
- Order: Diptera
- Family: Conopidae
- Genus: Myopa
- Species: M. rubida

Binomial name
- Myopa rubida (Bigot, 1887)

= Myopa rubida =

Species of fly

Myopa rubida is a species of thick-headed flies in the family Conopidae.
