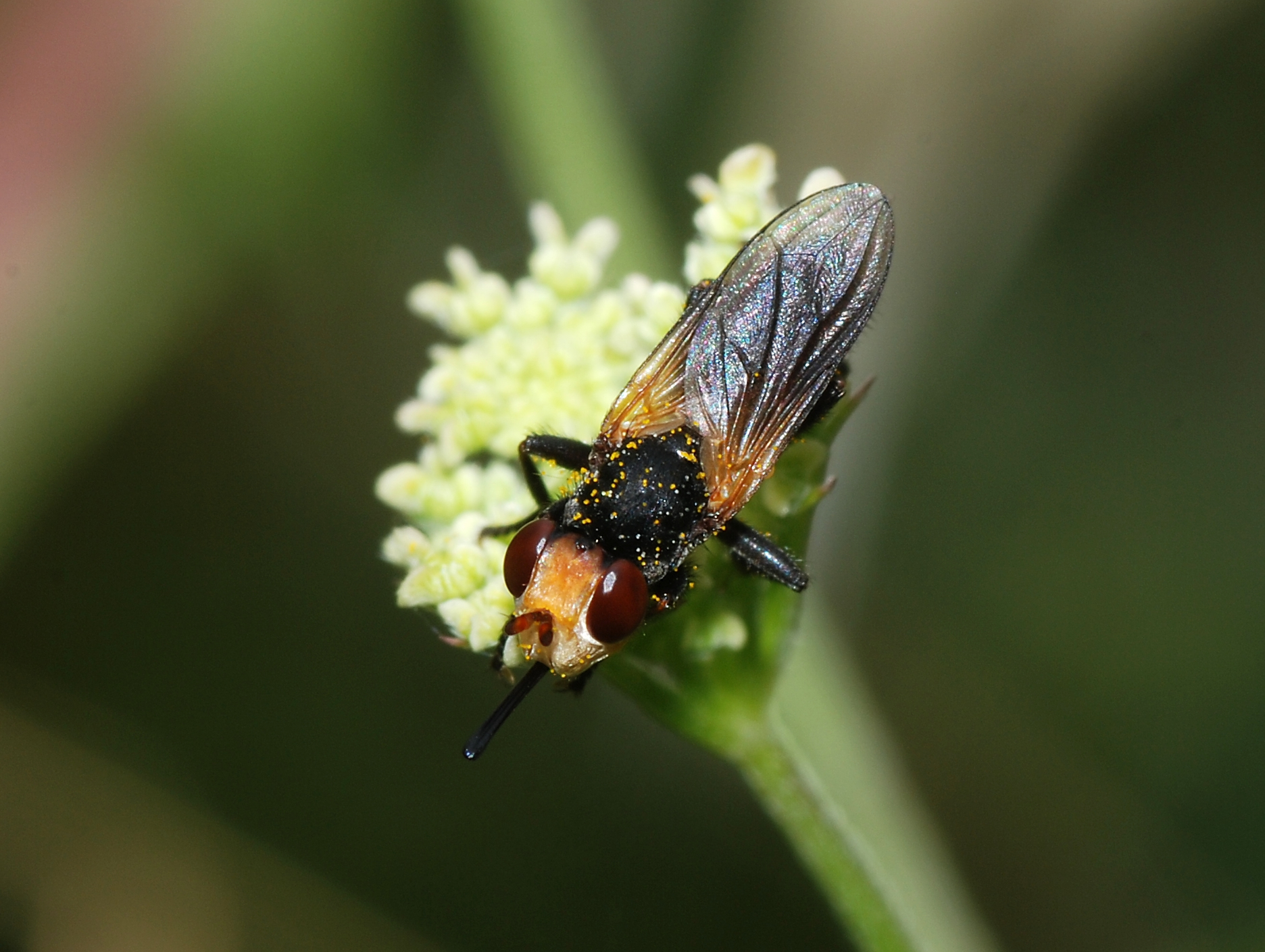
- Zodion sp.

Scientific classification
- Kingdom: Animalia
- Phylum: Arthropoda
- Clade: Pancrustacea
- Class: Insecta
- Order: Diptera
- Family: Conopidae
- Subfamily: Myopinae
- Tribe: Zodionini
- Genus: Zodion; Latreille, 1796

Type species
- Myopa cinerea Fabricius, 1794

Species
- See text

= Zodion =

Genus of flies

Zodion is a large genus of flies from the family Conopidae.

== Species ==
- Zodion abdominale Say, 1823
- Zodion abitus Adams, 1903
- Zodion aenescens Aczel, 1950
- Zodion americanum Wiedemann, 1830
- Zodion anale Kröber, 1915
- Zodion auricaudatum Williston, 1892
- Zodion bellum Camras, 2004
- Zodion bicolor Adams, 1903
- Zodion caesium Becker, 1908
- Zodion californicum Camras, 1954
- Zodion carceli Robineau-Desvoidy, 1830
- Zodion chvalai Camras, 2004
- Zodion cinereiventre Van Duzee, 1927
- Zodion cinereum (Fabricius, 1794)
- Zodion cyanescens Camras, 1943
- Zodion erythrurum Rondani, 1865
- Zodion fulvifrons Say, 1823
- Zodion intermedium Banks, 1916
- Zodion kroeberi Szilády, 1926
- Zodion malayense Stuke, 2004
- Zodion neocaledonicum Stuke, 2014
- Zodion nigrifrons Kröber, 1915
- Zodion nigritarse Strobl, 1902
- Zodion notatum (Meigen, 1804)
- Zodion obliquefasciatum (Macquart, 1846)
- Zodion parvum Adams, 1903
- Zodion perlongum Coquillett, 1902
- Zodion pictulum Williston, 1885
- Zodion rossi Camras, 1957
- Zodion scapulare Adams, 1903
- Zodion triste Bigot, 1887
- Zodion zebrinum Bigot, 1887
