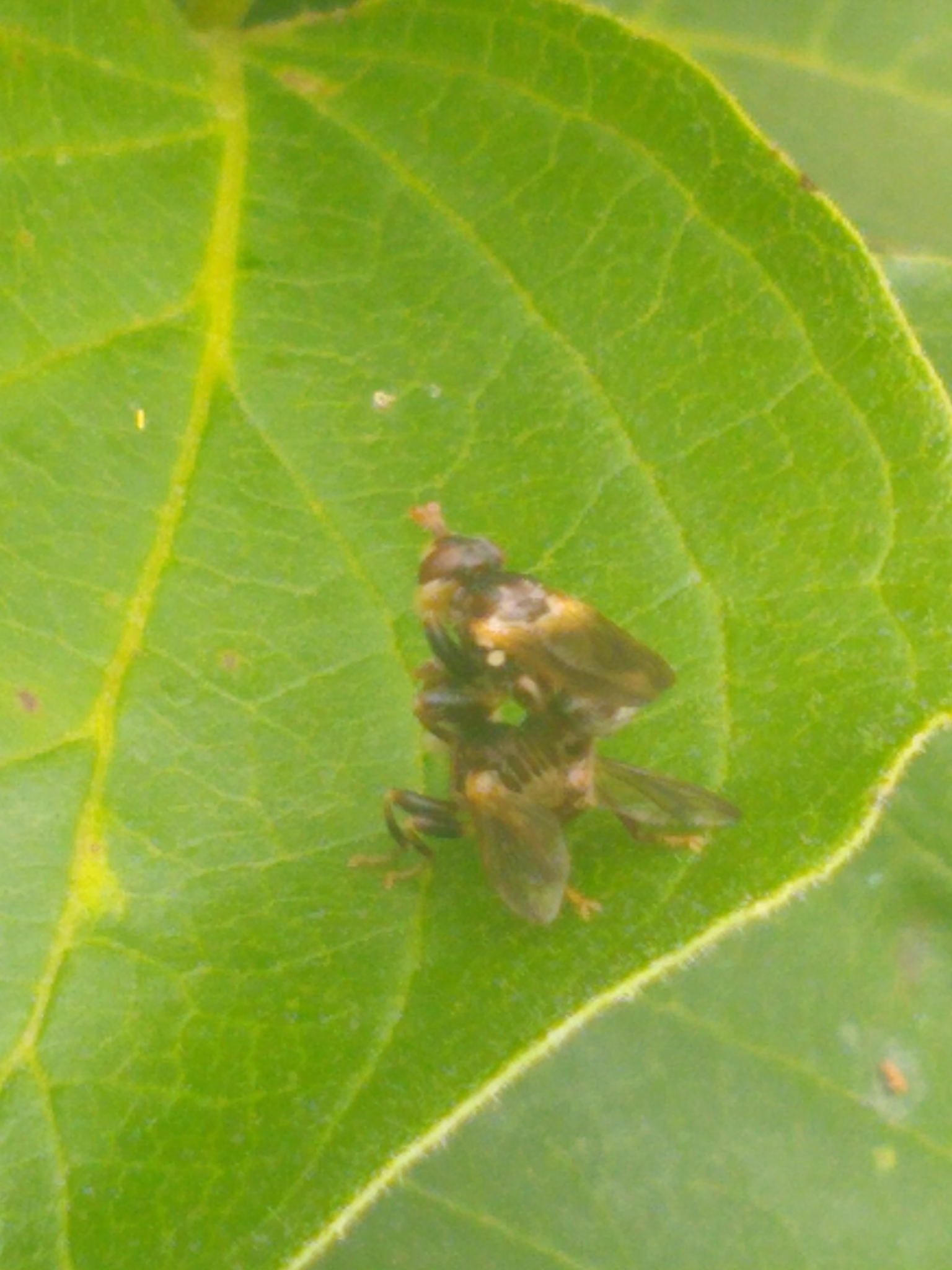
- Myopa vesiculosa pair mating

Scientific classification
- Domain: Eukaryota
- Kingdom: Animalia
- Phylum: Arthropoda
- Class: Insecta
- Order: Diptera
- Family: Conopidae
- Genus: Myopa
- Species: M. vesiculosa

Binomial name
- Myopa vesiculosa Say, 1823

Synonyms
- Glossigona maculifrons Bigot, 1887; Myopa apicalis Walker, 1849; Myopa conjuncta Thomson, 1869; Myopa utahensis Stains and Knowlton, 1939

= Myopa vesiculosa =

Species of fly

Myopa vesiculosa is a species of thick-headed flies in the family Conopidae.
