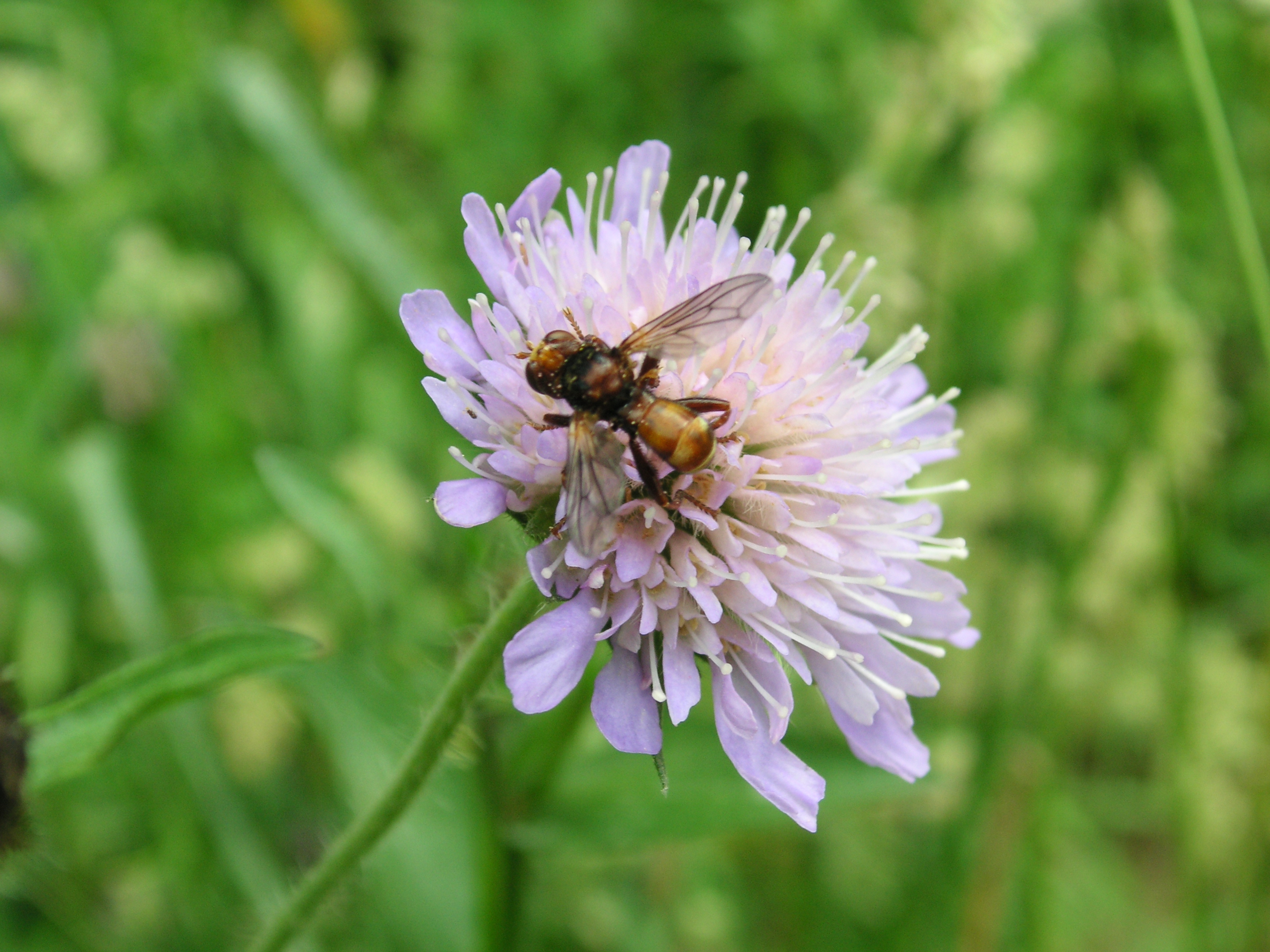
- Myopa buccata

Scientific classification
- Kingdom: Animalia
- Phylum: Arthropoda
- Clade: Pancrustacea
- Class: Insecta
- Order: Diptera
- Family: Conopidae
- Subfamily: Myopinae
- Tribe: Myopini; Fabricius, 1775

Genera
- See text

= Myopini =

Tribe of flies

Myopini is a tribe of flies from the family Conopidae.

== Genera ==
- Myopa Fabricius, 1775
- Thecophora Rondani, 1845

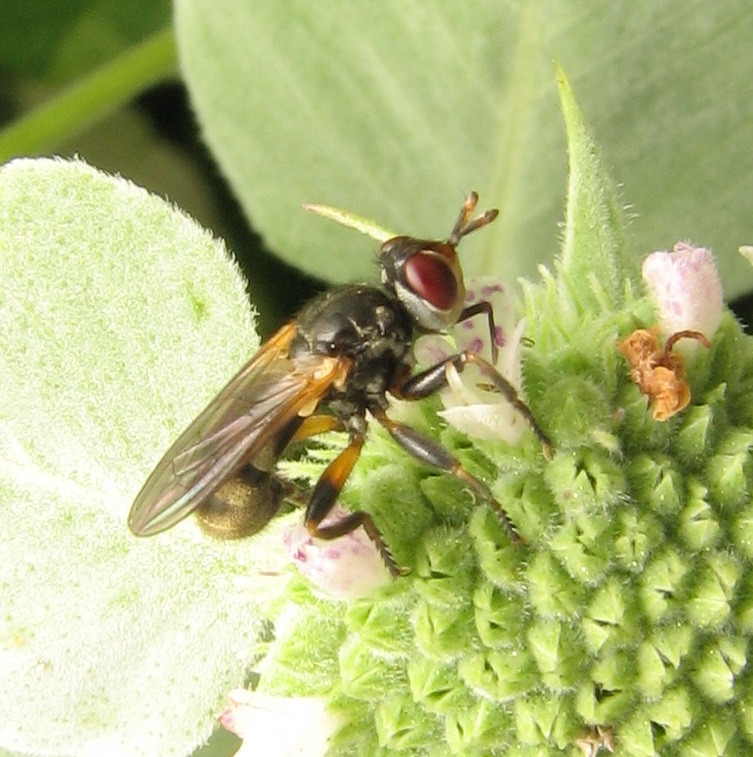
Thecophora sp. on mountain mint
