= Zodion obliquefasciatum =

Scientific classification
- Kingdom: Animalia
- Phylum: Arthropoda
- Class: Insecta
- Order: Diptera
- Family: Conopidae
- Genus: Zodion
- Species: Z. obliquefasciatum

Binomial name
- Zodion obliquefasciatum (Macquart, 1846)

Synonyms
- Myopa obliquefasciatum Macquart, 1846; Myopa tectura Adams, 1903; Zodion leucostoma Williston, 1885

Species of fly

Zodion obliquefasciatum is a species of thick-headed flies in the family Conopidae.
