= Zodion fulvifrons =

Scientific classification
- Kingdom: Animalia
- Phylum: Arthropoda
- Class: Insecta
- Order: Diptera
- Family: Conopidae
- Genus: Zodion
- Species: Z. fulvifrons

Binomial name
- Zodion fulvifrons Say, 1823

Synonyms
- Myopa bistria Walker, 1849; Myopa rubrifrons Robineau-Desvoidy, 1830; Zodion abdominalis Say, 1823; Zodion bilineata Van Duzee, 1927; Zodion lativentre Graenicher, 1910; Zodion obscurum Banks, 1916; Zodion reclusum Banks, 1916; Zodion sayi Banks, 1916

Species of fly

Zodion fulvifrons is a species of thick-headed flies in the family Conopidae.
