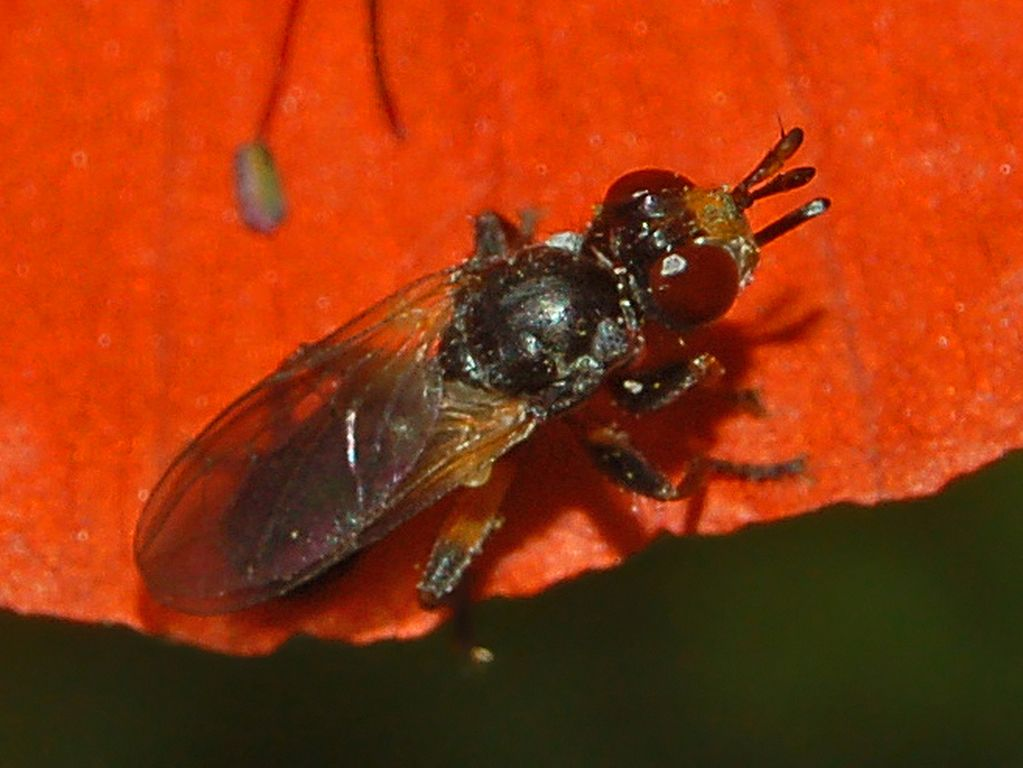
- Thecophora cf. pusilla, dorsal view

Scientific classification
- Kingdom: Animalia
- Phylum: Arthropoda
- Clade: Pancrustacea
- Class: Insecta
- Order: Diptera
- Family: Conopidae
- Subfamily: Myopinae
- Genus: Thecophora; Rondani, 1845

Synonyms
- Occemya Curran, 1934; Occemyia Robineau-Desvoidy, 1853; Oncomyia Loew, 1866

= Thecophora =

Genus of flies

Thecophora is a genus of thick-headed fly from the family Conopidae.

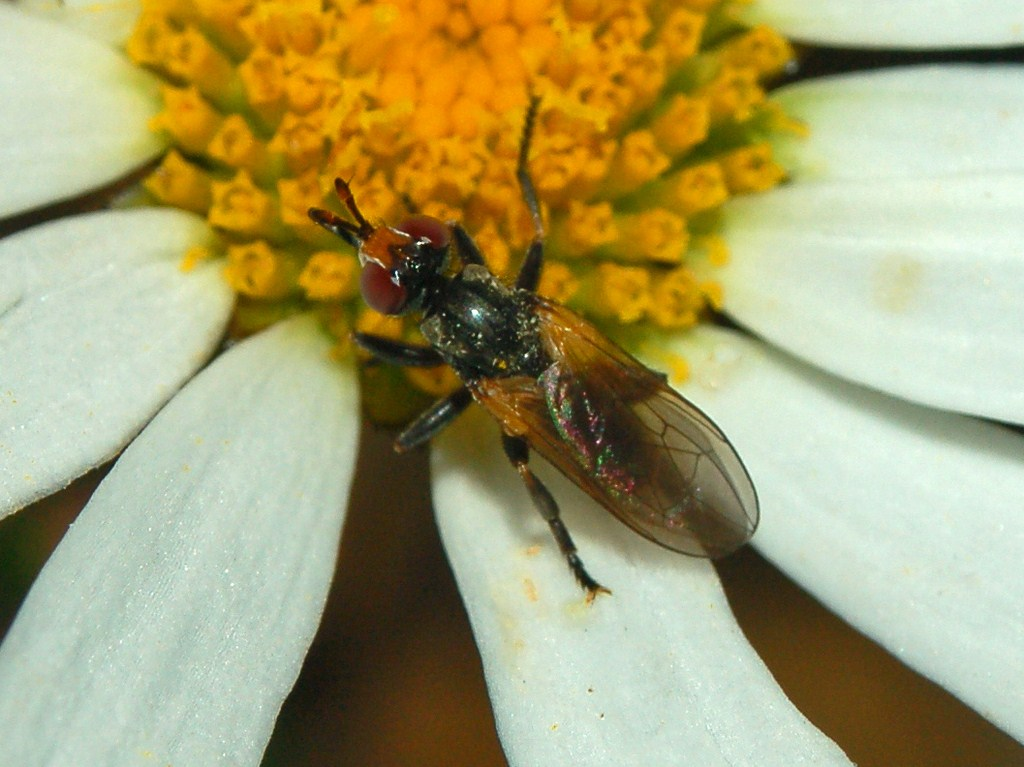
Thecophora atra

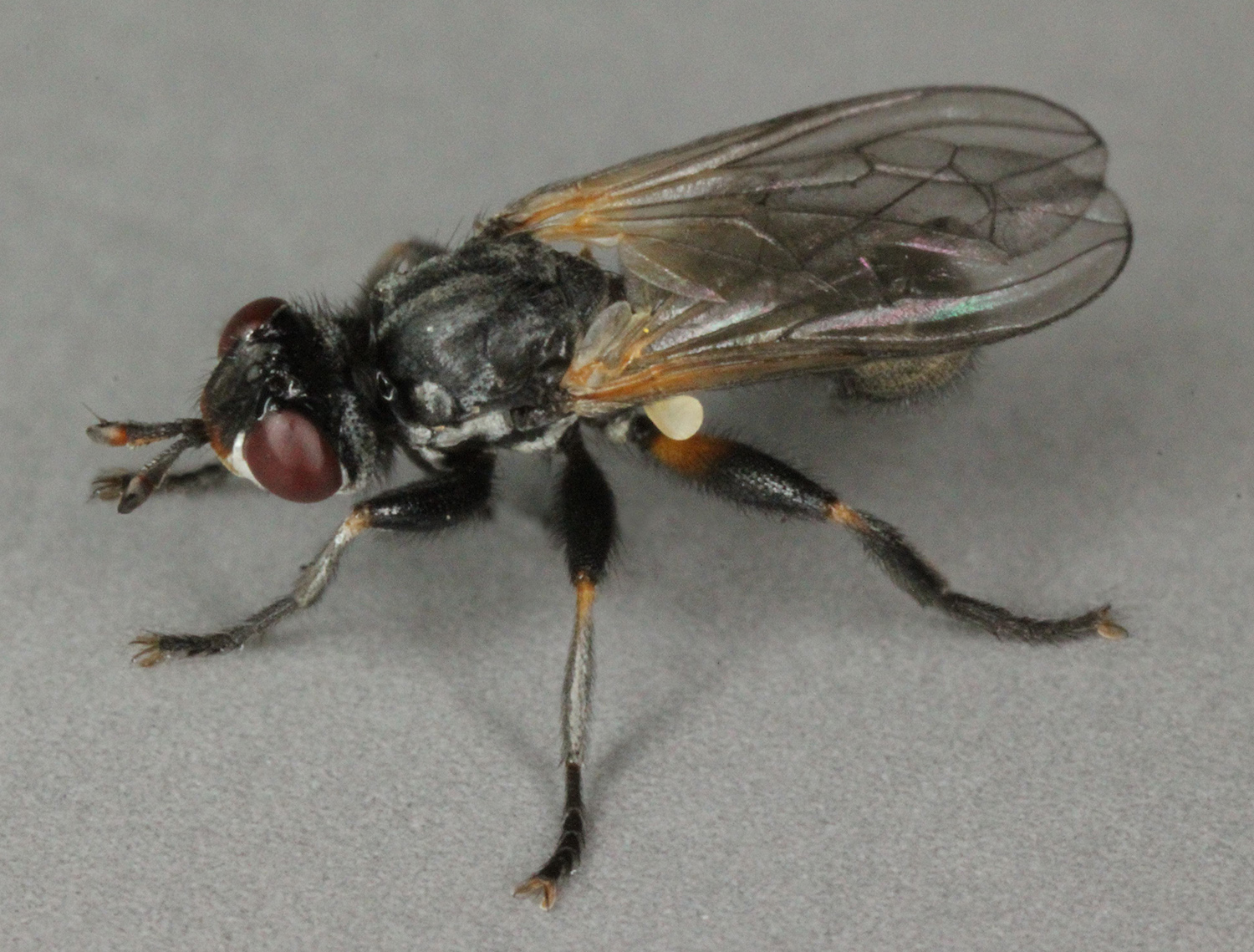
Thecophora atra, North Wales

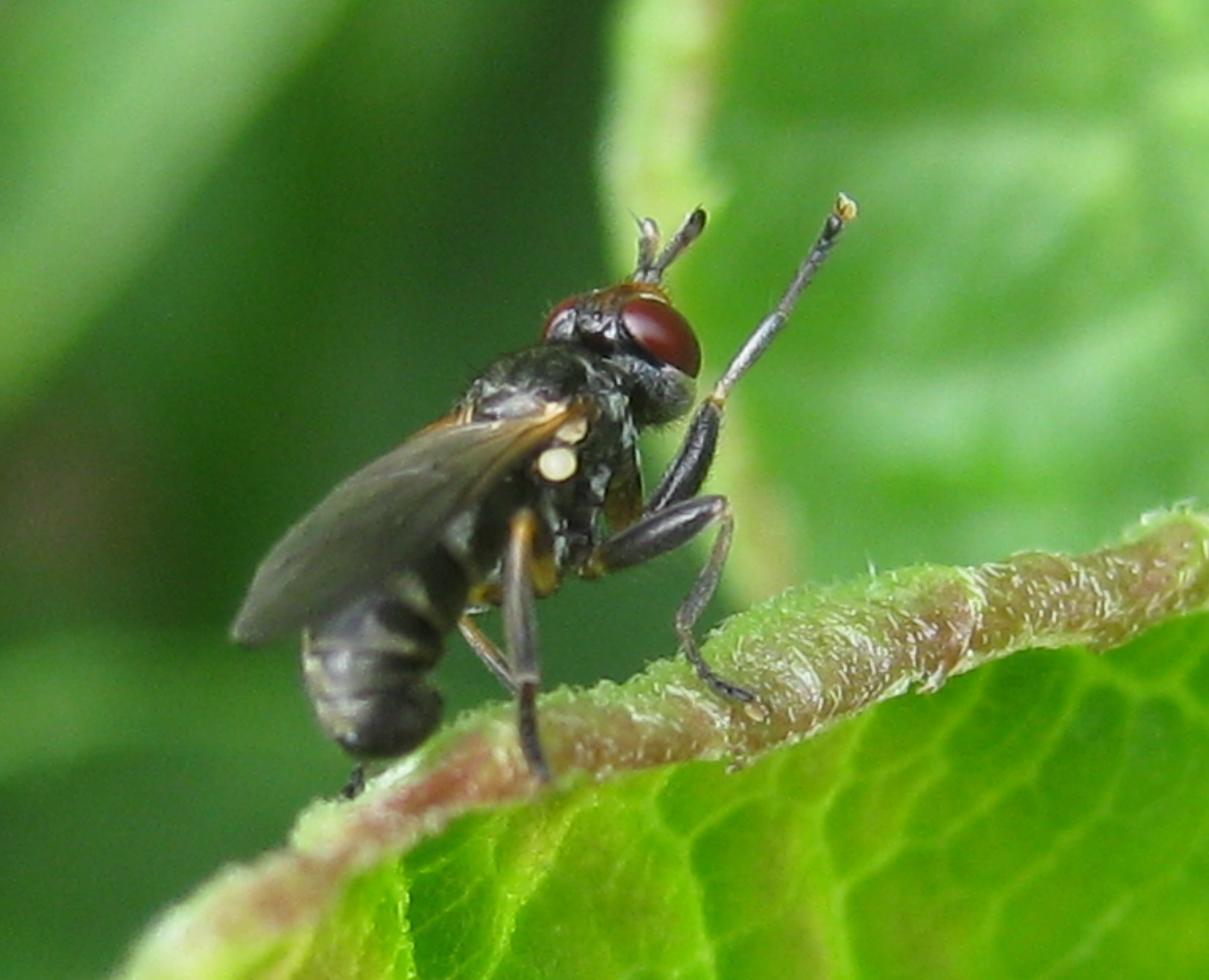
Thecophora sp.

They are frequently found on flowers. They are endoparasites of other insects, specially bees.

== Species ==
These 42 species belong to the genus Thecophora:

- Thecophora abbreviata (Loew, 1866)^{i c g}
- Thecophora africana (Brunetti, 1925)^{c g}
- Thecophora apivora Zimina, 1968^{c g}
- Thecophora atra (Fabricius, 1775)^{c g}
- Thecophora australiana (Camras, 1955)^{c g}
- Thecophora bimaculata Preyssler, 1791^{c g}
- Thecophora caenovala (Krober, 1916)^{c g}
- Thecophora caevovalva (Krober, 1915)^{g}
- Thecophora cinerascens Meigen, 1804^{c g}
- Thecophora clementsi^{g}
- Thecophora curticornis (Krober, 1916)^{c g}
- Thecophora distincta (Wiedemann in Meigen, 1824)^{c g}
- Thecophora flavicornis (Krober, 1936)^{c g}
- Thecophora flavipes (Brunetti, 1923)^{c g}
- Thecophora freidbergi^{g}
- Thecophora fulvipes Robineau-Desvoidy, 1830^{c g}
- Thecophora haitiensis (Parsons, 1940)^{c g}
- Thecophora hyalipennis (Krober, 1916)^{c g}
- Thecophora jakutica Zimina, 1974^{c g}
- Thecophora longicornis (Say, 1823)^{i c g}
- Thecophora longirostris Lyneborg, 1962^{c g}
- Thecophora luteipes (Camras, 1945)^{i c g}
- Thecophora melanopa Rondani, 1857^{c g}
- Thecophora metallica Camras, 1962^{c g}
- Thecophora modesta (Williston, 1883)^{i c g}
- Thecophora nigra (Van Duzee, 1927)^{i c g}
- Thecophora nigrifrons^{g}
- Thecophora nigripes (Camras, 1945)^{i c g}
- Thecophora nigrivena Camras, 1962^{c g}
- Thecophora obscuripes (Chen, 1939)^{c g}
- Thecophora obsoleta^{g}
- Thecophora occidensis (Walker, 1849)^{i c g}
- Thecophora papuana Camras, 1961^{c g}
- Thecophora philippinensis Camras, 1960^{c g}
- Thecophora pilosa (Krober, 1916)^{c}
- Thecophora propinqua (Adams, 1903)^{i c g b}
- Thecophora rufifrons Camras, 1981^{c g}
- Thecophora ruwenzoria Camras, 1962^{c g}
- Thecophora sauteri (Krober, 1916)^{c g}
- Thecophora simillima (Meijere, 1904)^{c g}
- Thecophora submetallica^{g}
- Thecophora testaceipes (Chen, 1939)^{c g}

Data sources: i = ITIS, c = Catalogue of Life, g = GBIF, b = Bugguide.net
