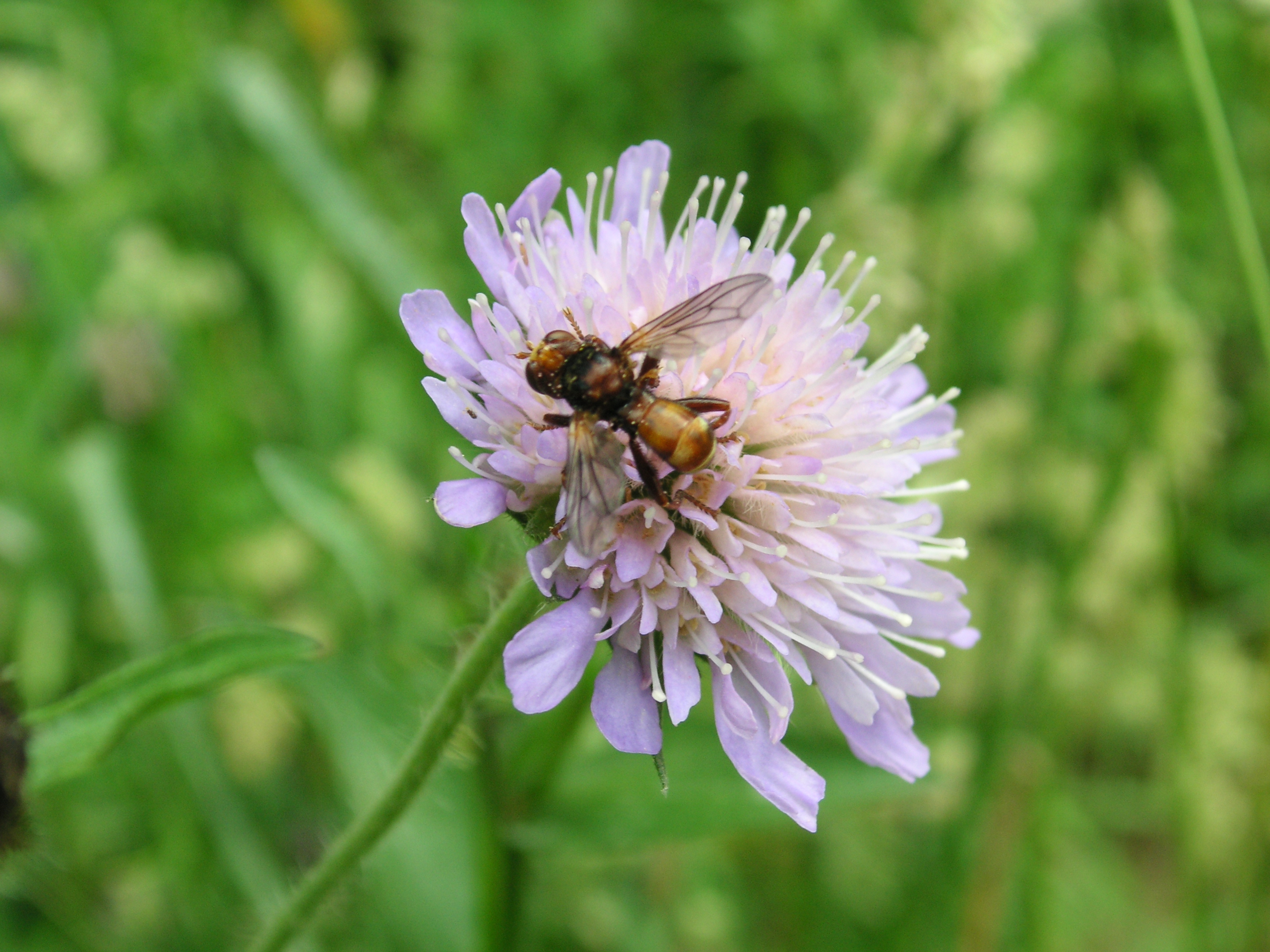

Scientific classification
- Kingdom: Animalia
- Phylum: Arthropoda
- Clade: Pancrustacea
- Class: Insecta
- Order: Diptera
- Family: Conopidae
- Genus: Myopa
- Species: M. buccata

Binomial name
- Myopa buccata (Linnaeus, 1758)

Synonyms
- Conops buccae Harris, 1776; Conops buccata Linnaeus, 1758; Myopa buccae (Harris, 1776)

= Myopa buccata =

Species of fly

The variegated spring beegrabber (Myopa buccata) is a species of fly from the genus Myopa in the family Conopidae. Their larvae are endoparasites of bumble bees of the genus Bombus. It is common throughout much of Europe.
