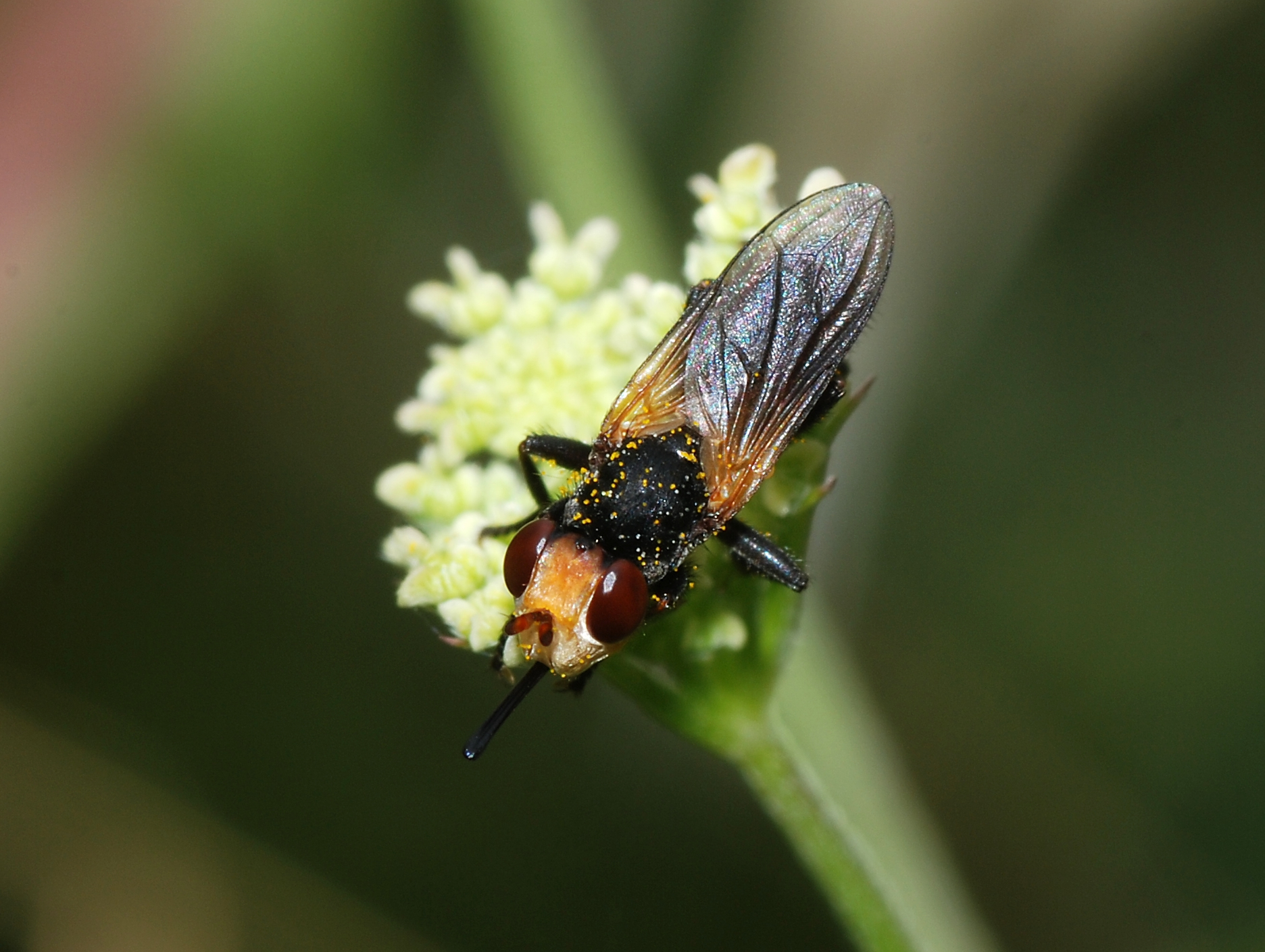
- Zodion sp.

Scientific classification
- Kingdom: Animalia
- Phylum: Arthropoda
- Clade: Pancrustacea
- Class: Insecta
- Order: Diptera
- Family: Conopidae
- Subfamily: Myopinae

Tribes
- See text

= Myopinae =

Subfamily of flies

Myopinae is a subfamily of flies from the family Conopidae.

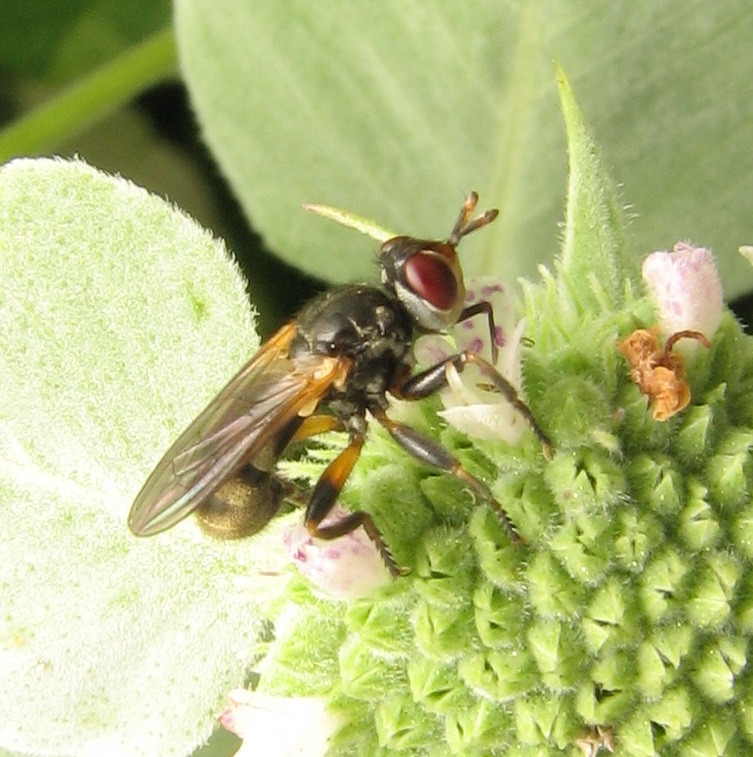
Thecophora sp. on mountain mint

== Tribes ==
- Myopini
- Sicini
- Zodionini
