= Avital (name) =

Hebrew name

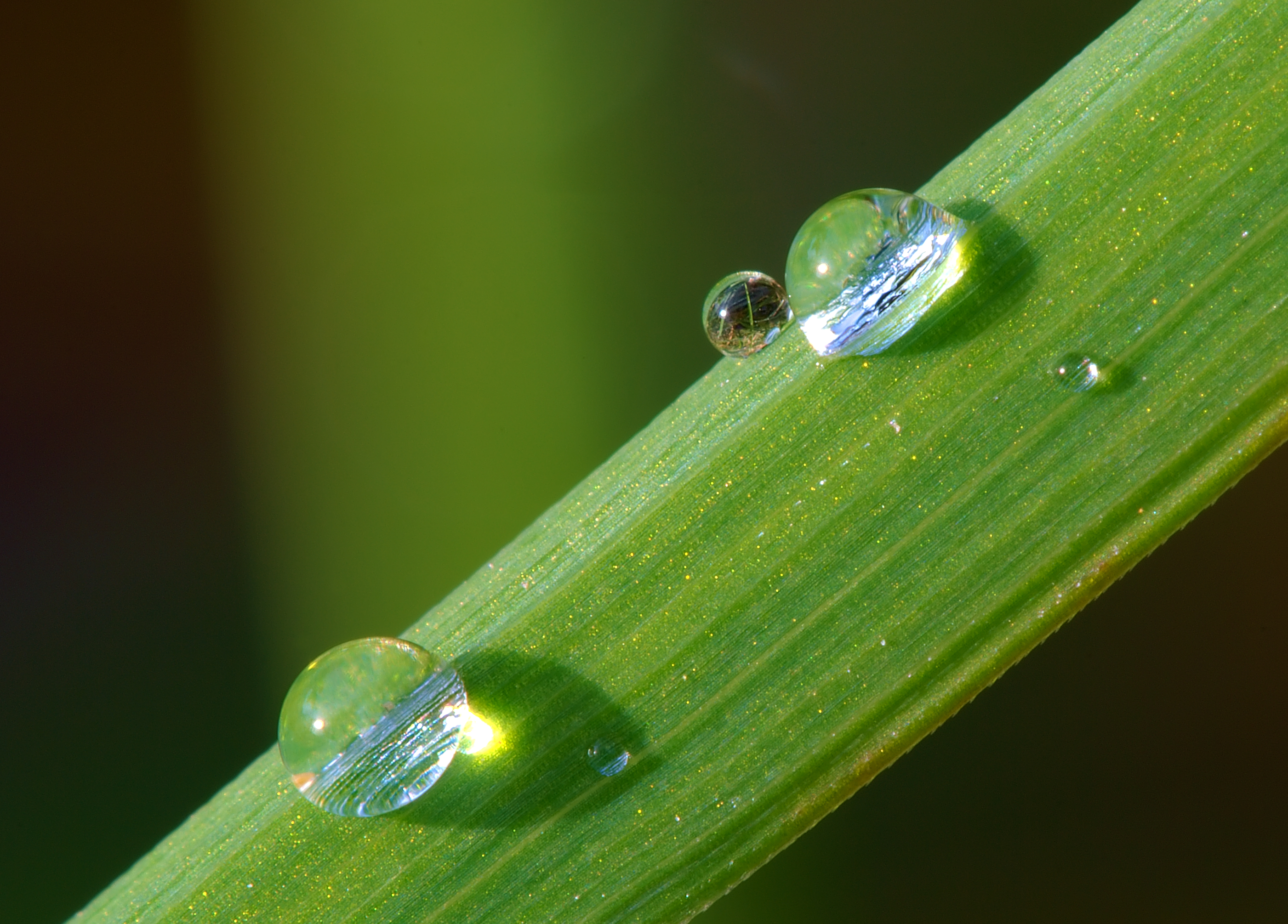
- Dew, the symbolic meaning of the name.
- Language: Hebrew

Origin
- Meaning: my father is [the] dew, dewy

Avital (Hebrew: אֲבִיטַל ’Ăḇîṭāl) is a Hebrew given name of Old Testament origin. Traditionally a female given name, its modern usage is unisex.

Avital is also used as a surname.

== Etymology ==
"Abital" translates to dewy (as in, morning dew) or my father is [the] dew (Ab-i means "my father"; -i is possessive pronoun for "my").

The name refers to dew, the phenomenon of water droplets that occur on exposed objects in the morning or evening due to condensation.

William Dwight Whitney's Century Dictionary of 1889 defines "avital" as "pertaining to a grandfather; ancestral", giving its root as the Latin avus, lit. 'grandfather'. It is used thus in 1889 by Hubert Lewis's The Ancient Laws of Wales.

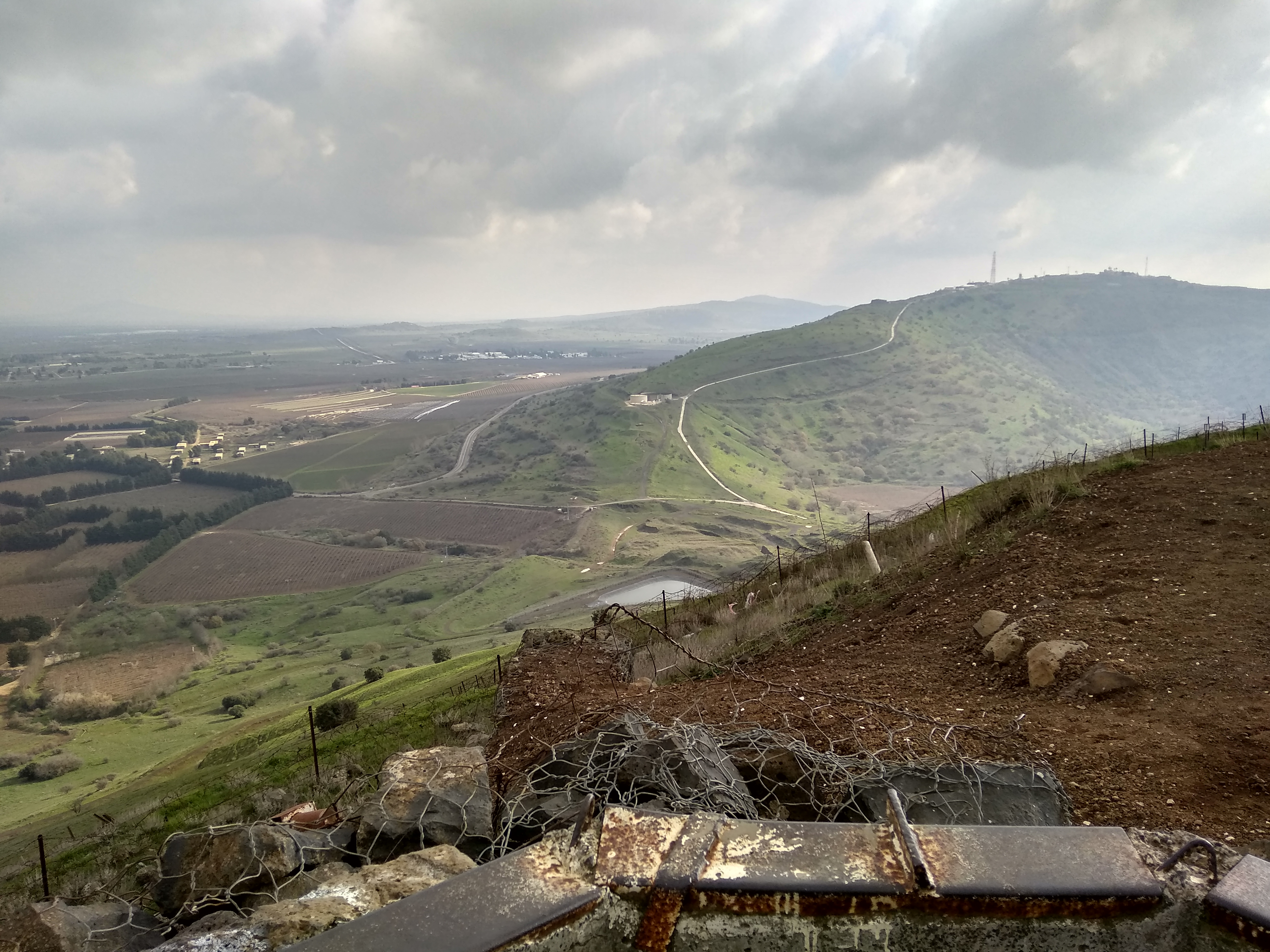
Mount Avital as seen from Mount Bental

=== Place name ===
The surname could potentially be a place name for the Avital moshav in Israel, named in 1953.

Alternatively, Mount Avital/Tall Abu an Nada (Hebrew: הר אביטל, Har Avital, Arabic: تل أبو الندى, Tall Abu an Nada) is a mountain that is part of a dormant volcano in the Golan Heights. It does not appear to have any correlation with the Avital moshav, being over an hour's drive away.

== Biblical character ==
The name was popularized by minor biblical character Abital, who is mentioned in the book of Samuel as one of King David's wives (II Samuel 3:4).

Abital gave birth to David's fifth son, Shephatiah, another minor biblical character.

== People ==
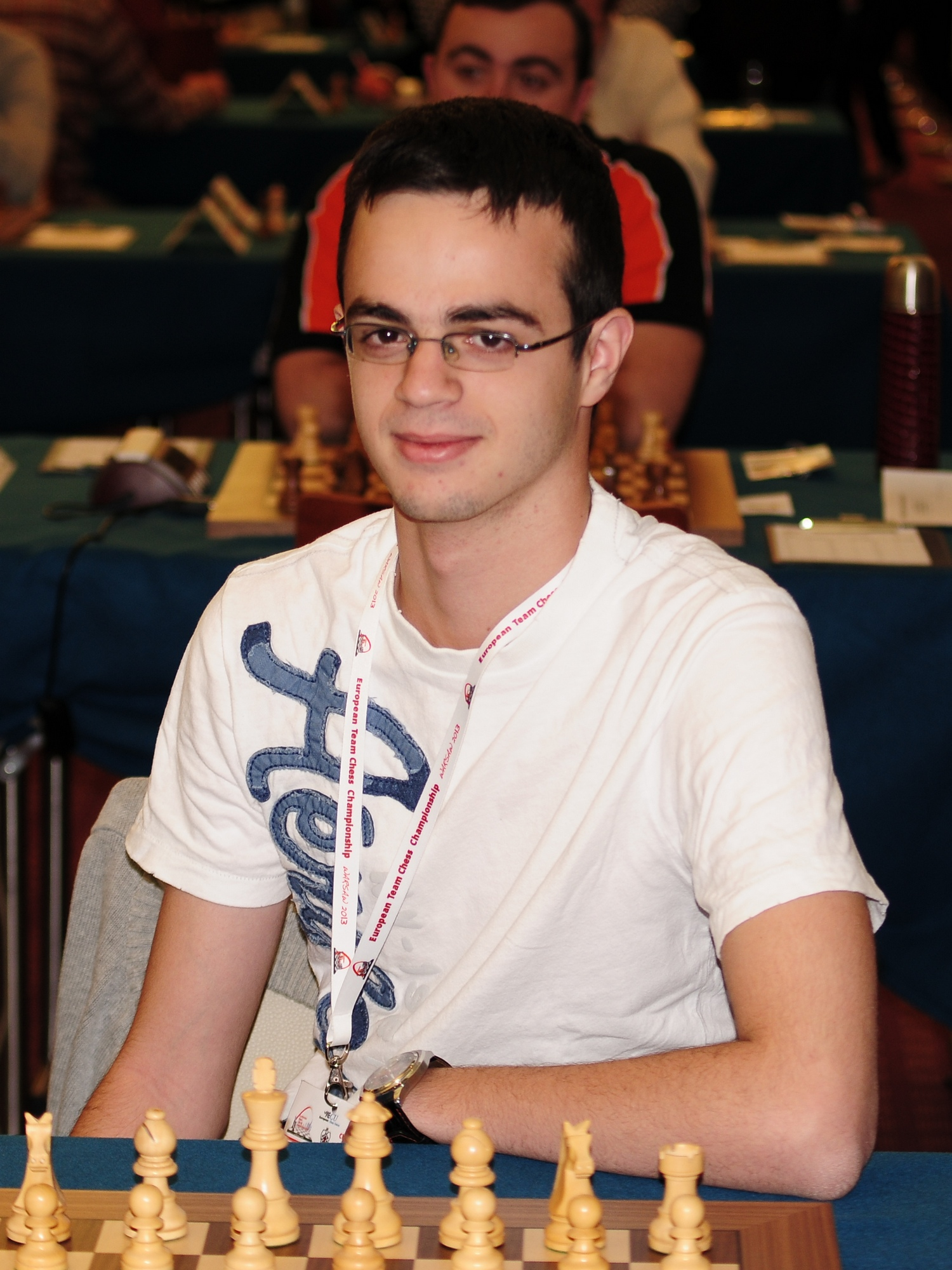
Chess player Avital Boruchovsky

=== As given name (female) ===
- Avital Sharansky, a Ukrainian activist and public figure in the Soviet Jewry Movement.
- Avital Ronell, an American professor.
- Avital Leibovich, director of the American Jewish Committee (AJC) in Israel.
- Avital Abergel, an Israeli actress.

=== As given name (male) ===
- Avital Boruchovsky, an Israeli chess player.
- Avital Inbar, an Israeli author.
- Avital Selinger, an Israeli volleyball player.
- Avital Tamir, an Israeli musician.

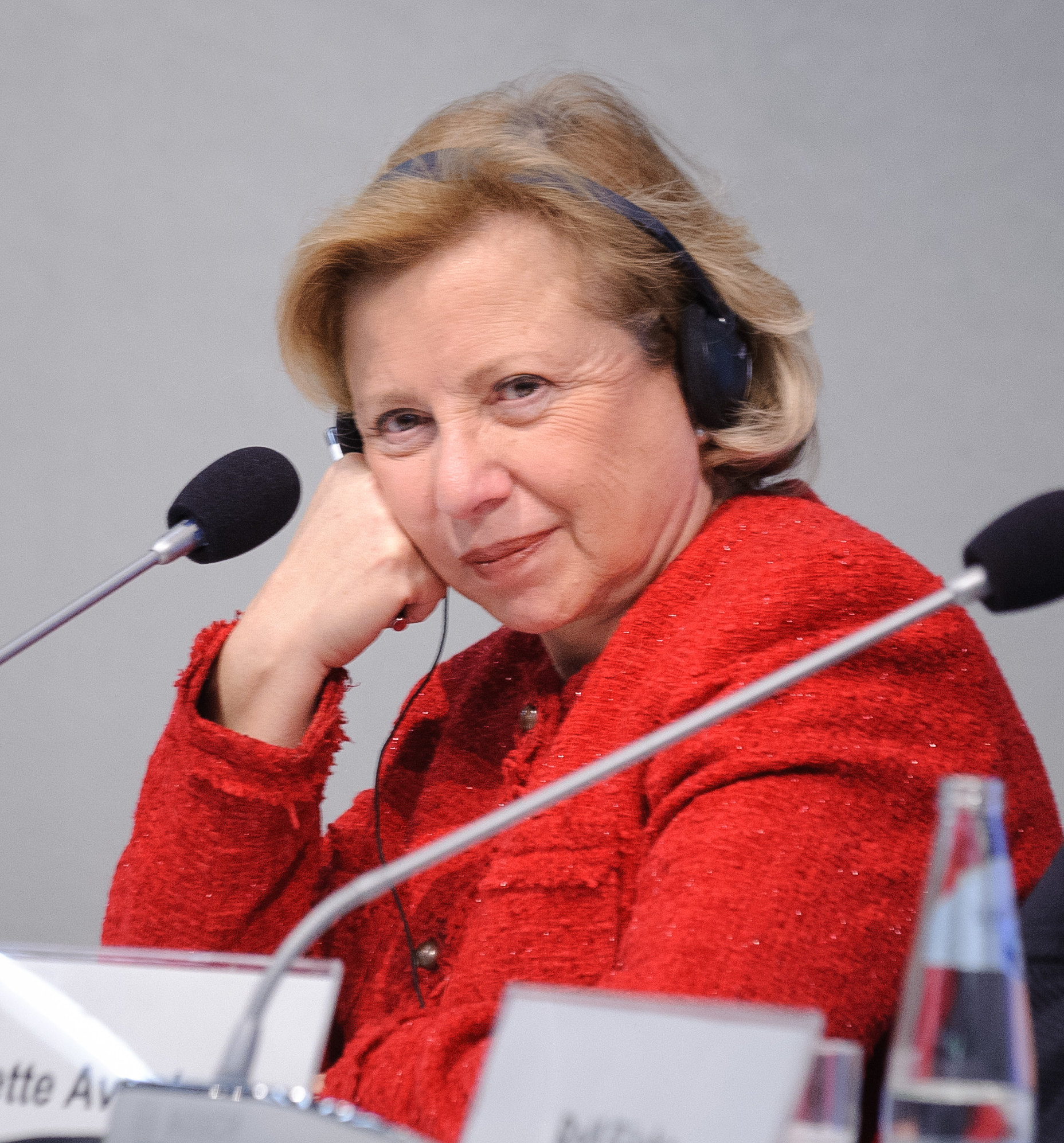
Colette Avital, Romanian-Israeli diplomat and politician

=== As surname ===
- Mili Avital, an Israeli actress, writer, and director.
- Shay Avital, Major General (Ret.) in the IDF and former head of the Special Operations Forces Command.
- Omer Avital, an Israeli-American jazz bassist, composer and bandleader.
- Avi Avital, an Israeli mandolinist.
- Tsion Avital, an Israeli philosopher of art and culture.
- Eden Avital, an Israeli footballer.
- Colette Avital, a Romanian-Israeli diplomat and politician.
- Doron Avital, an Israeli politician.
- Shmuel Avital, an Israeli politician.
