= List of Greek and Latin roots in English/D =

All Latin and Greek roots beginning with D

Lists of Greek and Latin roots in English beginning with other letters:
- A
- B
- C
- D
- E
- F
- G
- H
- I
- J
- K
- L
- M
- N
- O
- P
- Q
- R
- S
- T
- U
- V
- X
- Z

== D ==
Root	Meaning in English	Origin language	Etymology (root origin)	English examples
da-, dida- (ΔΑ)	learn	Greek	δάω	autodidact, Didache, didact, didactic, didacticism
dacry-	tear	Greek	δάκρυον, δακρύειν, δάκρυμα (dákruma)	dacryoadenitis, Dacryphilia
dactyl-	digit, finger, toe	Greek	δάκτυλος (dáktulos)	anisodactyly, antidactylus, arachnodactyly, artiodactyl, brachydactyly, clinodactyly, dactyl, dactylic, dactylology, dactylomancy, dactylomegaly, dactylus, dactyly, date, didactyly, ectrodactyly, heterodactylous, heterodactyly, leptodactylous, monodactyly, oligodactyly, pamprodactyly, pentadactyl, pentadactylous, pentadactyly, perissodactyl, polydactyly, pterodactyl, schizodactyly, syndactylous, syndactyly, tetradactylous, tetradactyly, tridactyly, zygodactyly
dam- (ΔΑΜ)	tame	Greek	δάμασις (dámasis), ἀδάμας (adámas) "untameable, invincible"	adamant, adamantine, adamantinoma, Damian
damn-, -demn-	to inflict loss upon	Latin	damnum, damnāre	condemn, condemnation, damage, damnation, indemnify, indemnity
de-	bind	Greek	δεῖν (deîn), δετός, δέσις (detós, désis), δέμα (déma), δεσμός (desmós), δέσμα (désma)	arthrodesis, asyndeton, desmid, desmitis, desmoid, desmoplasia, desmosome, diadem, plasmodesma, polysyndeton, syndesis, syndesmosis, syndetic, syndeton
de-	down, away from, removing	Latin	dē	decay, decide, declare, decline, decompose, dedicate, deduce, defend, deletion, delineate, delude, demarcate, dementia, depress, derogatory, desecrate, descend, destroy, detract
deb-	owe	Latin	debere, debitus	debit, debt
dec-	ten	Latin from Greek	δέκα (déka) "ten", δεκάς, δεκάδος (dekás, dekádos), δεκάκις (dekákis) "ten times", δεκαπλάσιος (dekaplásios) "ten-fold" decem, "ten" decies, "ten times" decumo, "tenfold"	decad, decade, decagon, decagram, decahedron, Decalogue, decamer, decamerous, decameter, decapod, decathlon
decim-	tenth part	Latin	decimus, tenth; from decem, ten	decimal, decimate, decimation, decimator, decuman, dime
decor-	ornament	Latin	decorus "fit, proper" and decorare "to decorate", from decor "beauty, ornament" and decus "ornament"	decor, décor, decorament, decorate, decoration, decorative, decorator, decorous, decorum, redecorate
del-	erase	Latin	delere (from dē + linere)	delete, deletion, indelible
delt-	D, d	Greek	Δ, δ, δέλτα (délta)	delta, deltoid, deltahedron
dem-, dom-	build	Greek	δέμειν (démein), δῶμα, δῶματος, δομή, δόμος (dómos), δέμας (démas)	apodeme, monodomy, opisthodomos, polydomy
dem-	people	Greek	δῆμος (dêmos)	Damocles, demagogue, deme, democracy, demographic, demography, demonym, demophobia, demotic, ecdemic, endemic, epidemic, epidemiology, pandemic
den-	ten each	Latin	dēnī	denar, denarian, denarius, denary, denier, dinar, dinero, dinheiro
dendr-	tree	Greek	δένδρον (déndron); akin to δρύς (drús) "tree"	dendric, dendrite, dendrochronology, dendrogram, dendromancy, Epidendrum, rhododendron
dens-	thick	Latin	densus	condensable, condensate, condensation, condensational, condensative, condense, dense, density, nondense, superdense
dent-	tooth	Latin	dens, dentis	bident, bidental, dandelion, dental, dentary, dentate, dentation, dentelle, denticity, denticle, denticulate, dentiferous, dentiform, dentifrice, dentigerous, dentil, dentin, dentinal, dentine, dentition, denture, indent, indentation, indenture, interdental, interdentil, intradental, multidentate, quadridentate, trident, tridentate
der-	skin	Greek	δέρειν (dérein), δέρμα, δέρματος (dérma, dérmatos)	Dermaptera, dermatology, dermis, ectoderm, endoderm, epidermis, hypodermic, mesoderm, scleroderma, taxidermy, xeroderma
despot-	master	Greek	δεσπότης, δεσπότου, δεσποτικός, δεσποτεία, δεσποτίσκος	despot, despotic, despotism
deuter-	second	Greek	δεύτερος (deúteros)	deuteragonist, deuteranomaly, deuteranopia, deuteride, deuterium, deuterogamist, deuterogamy, Deuteromycota, deuteron, Deuteronomy, deuterostome
dexi-	right	Greek	δεξιός (dexiós)	Dexiarchia
dexter-	right	Latin	dexter	ambidexterity, ambidextrous, dexter, dexterity, dexterous, dextral, dextrality, dextrin, dextrorse, dextrose
di-	two	Greek	δι- (di-)	diatomic, dicot, digamy, diode, dipole
dia-	apart, through	Greek	διά (diá)	deacon, diagram, dialysis, diameter
div-, diff-	different	Latin	diversum	different, divergence, diversity, divide, diffeomorphism
diacosi-	two hundred	Greek	διακόσιοι (diakósioi), διακοσιάκις "two hundred times"	diacosigon, diacosipentecontaheptagon
dic-, dict-	say, speak, proclaim	Latin	dīcere, dictus, dictare	benediction, contradict, dictate, dictation, dictator, diction, dictionary, dictum, edict, indictment, interdiction, malediction, predict, prediction, valediction, verdict
dida-	teach	Greek	διδάσκειν (didáskein)	autodidact, Didache, didact, didactic
digit-	finger	Latin	digitus	bidigitate, digit, digital, digitate, digitiform, digitigrade, multidigit, multidigitate
din-	terrible, fearfully great	Greek	δεινός (deinós)	dinosaur
dipl-	twofold	Greek	διπλόος (diplóos), δίπλωσις (díplōsis), δίπλωμα (díplōma)	diploblasty, diploid, diploidy, diploma, diplomacy, diplomat, diplomatic, diplomatics, diplonema, diplophase, diplopia, diplosis, diplotene, haplodiploid, haplodiploidy
do- (ΔΟ)	give	Greek	διδόναι (didónai), δοτός, (dotós,), δόσις (dósis), δόμα, δόματος (dóma, dómatos) δῶρον, διδόμενον	anecdote, antidoron, antidote, apodosis, dose
doc-, doct-	teach	Latin	docere, doctus	docile, doctor, doctrine, document, indoctrinate, indoctrination
dodec-	twelve	Greek	δώδεκα (dṓdeka)	dodecagon, dodecahedron, Dodecanese, dodecaphony, dodecastyle, dodecasyllabic, hemidodecahedron
dog-, dox-	opinion, tenet	Greek	δοκεῖν (dokeîn) "to appear, seem, think", δόξα (dóxa) "opinion", δόγμα (dógma)	dogma, dogmatic, dogmatism, doxology, heterodox, orthodox, paradox
dol-	pain	Latin	dolere "to grieve", also dolus "grief" and dolor "pain"	condolence, dol, doleful, dolorous, indolence
dom-	house	Latin	domus	dame, domal, dome, domestic, domesticate, domestication, domesticity, domestique, domicile, domiciliary, major-domo, semidome
domin-	master	Latin	dominus "master"; (from domus "house")	beldam, beldame, belladonna, codomain, codominance, codominant, condominium, dam, dame, damsel, danger, demesne, demoiselle, domain, dominance, dominant, dominate, domination, dominative, dominator, dominatrix, domine, domineer, dominicide, dominion, dominium, domino, duenna, dungeon, madam, madame, mademoiselle, madonna, predominance, predominant, predominate, quasidominance, semidominance, subdominant, superdominant
domit-	tame	Latin	domitare, frequentative of domare	daunt, domitable, indomitable
don-	give	Latin	dōnum, donare	condonation, condone, donate, donation, donative, donator, donatory, donor, pardon, pardonable
dorm-	sleep	Latin	dormire	dormant, dormitory
dors-	back	Latin	dorsum	disendorse, dorsal, dorsiferous, dorsiflexion, dorsiflexor, dorsigrade, dorsiventral, dorsum, dossier, endorse, endorsee, endorsement, indorse, indorsement, reredos
dra-	do	Greek	δρᾶν (drân), δραστικός (drastikós), δρᾶσις (drâsis), δρᾶμα, δράματος (drâma, drámatos), δραματικός (dramatikós)	dramatic, dramaturgy, drastic, melodramatic, monodrama
drac-	dragon	Latin	draco	Draco, draconian
drach-	grasp	Greek	δράσσεσθαι (drássesthai), δράγμα (drágma), δραχμή (drakhmḗ)	didrachm, drachm, drachma, dram, tetradrachm
dram-, drom- (ΔΡΑΜ)	run	Greek	δραμεῖν (drameîn), δρόμος (drómos)	aerodrome, anadromous, antidromic, catadromous, diadromous, dromaeosaurid, heterodromous, hippodrome, loxodrome, monodromy, palindrome, syndrome
dros-	dew	Greek	δρόσος, δρόσου (drósos, drósou)	drosometer, Drosophila
dry-	tree	Greek	δρῦς, δρυός (drûs, druós), Δρυάς	dryad, dryadic, hamadryad
du-	two	Latin	duo	deuce, doubt, dual, duality, duet, duo, duplex, duplicity, duumvirate, duumviri, nonduality
dub-	doubtful	Latin	dubius	doubt, dubiety, dubious
duc-, duct-	lead	Latin	ducere, ductus	abduce, abduct, adduce, adduct, conduce, deduce, induce, introduce, produce, reduce, seduce, traduce
dulc-	sweet	Latin	dulcis	billet-doux, dolce, dolcetto, douce, doux, dulcet, dulcian, dulcify, dulcimer, edulcorant, edulcorate, subdulcid
dur-	hard	Latin	durus, durare	dour, dura, durability, durable, durain, dural, duramen, durance, durancy, duration, durative, dure, duress, durity, durous, durum, endurable, endurance, endurant, endure, indurate, induration, nondurable, obduracy, obdurate, obduration, perdurable, perdurance, perdure, subdural
dy-	two	Greek	δύο (dúo), δυάς, δυάδος (duás, duádos)	dyad, dyadic
dyna-	power	Greek	δύνασθαι (dúnasthai), δυνατός, δύναμις (dúnamis), δυνάστης (dunástēs)	aerodynamic, aerodynamics, antidynastic, autodyne, didynamous, dynamic, dynamism, dynamite, dynamo, dynast, dynastic, dynasty, heterodyne, metadynamics
dys-	badly, ill	Greek	δυσ- (dus-)	dysentery, dysphagia, dysphasia, dysplasia, dystopia, dystrophy
