= English prefix =

English affixes added before a word

English prefixes are affixes (i.e., bound morphemes that provide lexical meaning) that are added before either simple roots or complex bases (or operands) consisting of (a) a root and other affixes, (b) multiple roots, or (c) multiple roots and other affixes. Examples of these follow:

- undo (consisting of prefix un- and root do)
- untouchable (consisting of prefix un-, root touch, and suffix -able)
- non-childproof (consisting of prefix non-, root child, and suffix -proof)
- non-childproofable (consisting of prefix non-, root child, root proof, and suffix -able)

English words may consist of multiple prefixes: anti-pseudo-classicism (containing both an anti- prefix and a pseudo- prefix).

In English, all prefixes are derivational. This contrasts with English suffixes, which may be either derivational or inflectional.

== Selectional restrictions ==
As is often the case with derivational morphology, many English prefixes can only be added to bases of particular lexical categories (or "parts of speech"). For example, the prefix re- meaning "again, back" is only added to verb bases as in rebuild, reclaim, reuse, resell, re-evaluate, resettle. It cannot be added to bases of other lexical categories. Thus, examples of re- plus a noun base (such as the ungrammatical *rehusband, *remonopoly) or re- plus an adjective base (*renatural, *rewise) are virtually unattested.

These selectional restrictions on what base a prefix can be attached to can be used to distinguish between otherwise identical-sounding prefixes. For instance, there are two different un- prefixes in English: one meaning "not, opposite of", the other meaning "reverse action, deprive of, release from". The first prefix un- "not" is attached to adjective and participle bases while the second prefix un- "reverse action" is attached to either verb or noun bases. Thus, English can have two words that are pronounced and spelled the same and have the same lexical category but have different meanings, different prefixes, a different internal morphological structure, and different internal bases that the prefixes are attached to:

- unlockable "not able to be locked"
- unlockable "able to be unlocked"

In the first unlockable "not able to be locked", the prefix un- "not" is attached to an adjective base lockable (which, in turn, is composed of lock + -able). This word has the following internal structure:

[ un [ [ lock ]_{verb} able ]_{adj} ]_{adj}

In the second unlockable "able to be unlocked", the prefix un- "reverse action" is attached to a verb base lock, resulting in the derived verb unlock. Subsequently, the -able suffix is added after the newly created unlock verb base deriving the adjective unlockable. This word has the following internal structure:

[ [ un [ lock ]_{verb} ]_{verb} able ]_{adj}

Only certain verbs or nouns can be used to form a new verb having the opposite meaning. In particular, using verbs describing an irreversible action produces words often considered nonsense, e.g. unkill, unspend, unlose, unring. These words may nevertheless be in occasional use for humorous or other effect.

== Changes in lexical category ==
Unlike derivational suffixes, English derivational prefixes typically do not change the lexical category of the base (and are so called class-maintaining prefixes). Thus, the word do, consisting of a single morpheme, is a verb, as is the word redo, which consists of the prefix re- and the base root do.

However, there are a few prefixes in English that are class-changing in that the word resulting after prefixation belongs to a lexical category that is different from the lexical category of the base. Examples of this type include a-, be-, and en-. a- typically creates adjectives from noun and verb bases: blaze (noun/verb) > ablaze (adj). The relatively unproductive be- creates transitive verbs from noun bases: witch (noun) > bewitch (verb). en- creates transitive verbs from noun bases: slave (noun) > enslave (verb).

== Native vs. non-native (neo-classical) prefixing ==
Several English words are analyzed as a combination of a dependent affix and an independent base, such as those found in words like boy-hood or un-just. Following Marchand (1969), these types of words are formed by native word-formation processes.

Other words in English (and also in French and German) are formed via foreign word-formation processes, particularly processes seen in Greek and Latin word-formation. These word types are often known as neo-classical (or neo-Latin) words and are often found in academic learned vocabulary domains (such as in science fields), as well as in inkhorn terms coined in the 17th and 18th centuries. Words of this nature are borrowed from either Greek or Latin or have been newly coined based upon Greek and Latin word-formation processes. It is possible to detect varying degrees of foreignness.

In some analytic frameworks, such neo-classical prefixes are excluded from analyses of English derivation on the grounds that they are not analyzable according to a mostly synchronic (that is, relatively productive or easily recognizable and relating to present-day idioms) English (that is, "native") basis. Conceptualized thus, anglicized neo-classical English words such as deceive are not analyzed by Marchand as being composed of a prefix de- and a bound base -ceive but are rather analyzed as being composed of a single morpheme (although the Latin sources of these English words are analyzed as such, as "native" Latin components in the Latin language). Similarly, pairs such as defend/defense and double (or duple)/duplicity are not considered morphologically related in Marchand's treatment of English word formation and are thus excluded too, though they are regarded as derivatives of the shared roots in Jespersen's and Koizul's, while in others, they may be seen as allomorphs or variants (like deep/depth, a pair formed of Germanic components). However, not all foreign words are unanalyzable according to such an English basis: some foreign elements have been nativized and have become a part of productive English word-formation processes. An example of such a now native English prefix is co- as in co-worker, which is ultimately derived from the Latin prefix com- (with its allomorphs co-, col-, con-, and cor-); and ex- as in ex-soldier, which derives from the Latin ex-.

== Initial combining forms vs prefixes ==
- Combining form

== List of English prefixes ==
=== Native ===
Prefix	Meaning	Example
a-	verb > predicative adjective with progressive aspect	afloat, atremble
after-	following after, behind	aftermath, afterlife
back-	behind an object/structure (locative/directional)	backhoe, backfire
be-	equipped with, covered with, beset with (pejorative or facetious)	bedeviled, becalm, bedazzle, bewitch
by-	near to, next to	byway, bypass, byproduct
down-	from higher/greater to lower/lesser	download, downright, downbeat
en-, em-	to make into, to put into, to get into	empower, enmesh
fore-	before, in front	forearm, forerunner, forebode
hind-	after	hindsight, hindquarters
mid-	middle	midstream, midlife
midi-	medium-sized	midi-length, midibus
mini-	small	minimarket, mini-room, minivan
mis-	wrong, astray	misinformation, misguide, misfortune, misbehave, misspell
off-	non-standard, away	off-color, offish, offset
on-	immediate proximity, locative	onset, onlook, ongoing, oncoming
out-	better, faster, longer, farther	outreach, outcome, outlier
over-	excessive, above	overreact, overact, overbearing
self-	self	self-sufficient, self-explanatory
step-	family relation by remarriage	stepbrother, stepmother, stepfather, stepsister
twi-	two	twibill, twilight, twins
un-	not, against, opposite of	unnecessary, unequal, undesirable, unhappy
un-	reverse action, deprive of, release from	undo, untie, unexpected, unlock
under-	below, beneath, lower in grade or dignity, lesser, insufficient	underachieve, underpass, understand, undergo
up-	greater, higher, or better	upgrade, uplift, upright
with-	against, back, away (from)	withstand, withhold

=== Neo-classical ===
Prefix	Meaning	Examples
a-	not, alpha privative	acyclic, asexual, atonal, atheist
Afro-	relating to Africa	Afro-American, Afro-Caribbean
ambi-	both	ambidextrous, ambitendency
amphi-	around, two, both, on both sides	amphiaster, amphitheatre, amphibian
an-, a-	not, without	anemic, asymmetric, anarchy
ana-, an-	up, against	anaglyph, anode, analog
Anglo-	relating to England	Anglo-Norman, Anglo-Saxon, Anglo-American
ante-	before	antenatal, antechamber, antedate
anti-, ant-	opposite, against	antagonist, antivenom
apo-, ap-	away from, detached	aphelion, apogee, apomorphine
arch-	ruling, dominating, most extreme (pejorative)	archangel, archaen, archconservative
astro-	star	astrobiology, astrology, astronomy
auto-	self	autobiography, automatic, autonomy
bi-	two	bicycle, biped, binomial, bigamy, binary, biweekly, bimonthly
bio-	life, biological	biology, biotic
circum-	around, surrounding	circumlocution, circumnavigate, circumference
cis-	on this side of	cislunar, cisatlantic
con-, co-, com-, col-, cor-	together or with	cohabit, colleague, commingle, confederation, correlation
contra-, contro-	opposite	contradict, contraindication, controvert
counter-	against, in opposition to	counteract, counterpart
cryo-	ice	cryogenics, cryobanks
crypt-, crypto-	hidden, secret	cryptic, cryptography, cryptocurrency
de-	down	depress, descend, decrease
demi-	half	demigod, demiglace, demi-plié
demo-	people	democracy, demography
deuter-	second	deuteragonist, deuterogamy
di-	two	dicotyledon, dioxide
dia-	through	dialysis, diameter
dis-, di-, dif-	apart	differ, dissect, divide
du-, duo-	two	dual, duet, duotone
eco-	ecological	ecosystem
electro-	electric, electricity	electro-analysis, electromagnetic
en-, el-, em-	in	ellipsis, emphasis, energetic
epi-, ep-	upon, at, close upon, in addition	ephemeron, epicentre, epidermis
eu-	good, true	eukaryote, eulogy, euphoria
Euro-	European	Eurocentric
ex-	out of	exit, expel, explode, exploit, explore, export
extra-	outside	extracurricular, extraordinary, extraterrestrial
Franco-	French, France	Francophile, Franco-British, Franco-German
geo-	relating to the earth or its surface	geography, geology, geometry
gyro-	spinning on an axis	gyrocopter, gyroscope, gyrosphere
hetero-	different	heterochromia, heterogeneous, heterotroph, heterozygous
hemi-	half	hemimorphic, hemisphere
Hispano-	Spanish, Spain	Hispanoamérica, hispanophobia
homo-	same	homogeneous, homogenize, homologous, homophone, homozygous
hydro-, hydra-	relating to water, or using water	hydroelectricity, hydrant, hydrogen
hyper-	excess, above, over	hyperthermia, hyperactive, hypersensitive
hypo-	deficient, under or below something, low	hypothermia, hypodermic, hypoallergenic
ideo-	image, idea	ideograph, ideology
idio-	individual, personal, unique	idiolect, idiopathic
in-	in, into	include, insert
Indo-	relating to the Indian subcontinent	Indo-European
in-, il-, im-, ir-	not, opposite of	illegal, illicit, impatient, impossible, inappropriate, inexact, irregular, irresponsible
infra-	below, beneath	infrared, infrastructure, infrasonic
inter-	among, between	intercede, internet, international
intra-	inside, within	intravenous, intracranial, intranet
iso-	equal	isochromatic, isotherm
Italo-	Italian, Italy	italophilia, italophobia
macro-	long	macrobiotic, macrocosm
mal-	badly	malnourish, maladjusted
maxi-	very long, very large	maxi-skirt, maximum
mega-, megalo-	great, large	megastar, megalopolis
meso-	middle, intermediate, halfway	mesosphere, mesoderm, mesozoa
meta-	after, along with, beyond, among, behind, transcending, self-referential	metaphysics, metacommunication
micro-	small	microbacillus, microscope
mono-, mon-	sole, only	monogamy, monotone, monosyllabic, monomial, monobrow, monarch
multi-, mult-	many	multicultural, multi-storey, multitude, multangular
neo-	new	neolithic
non-	not	nonexistent, non-fiction
ob-	to, against	object, obligate
omni-	all	omnipotent, omnipresent, omnivore
ortho-	correcting or straightening	orthodontics, orthotropic
paleo-	old	paleolithic, paleontologist
pan-	all, worldwide	pan-American, pandemic, panorama
para-	beside, beyond	parallel, paraplegic, parasail
ped-	foot	pedal, pedestrian
pen-	almost	peninsula, penultimate, penumbra
per-	through, completely, wrongly, exceedingly	permeate, permute
peri-	around, near or adjacent	perihelion, periphrase
photo-	light	photoelectric, photography, photosynthesis
pleo-	more	pleonasm, pleroma
pod-	foot	podiatrist, podium
poly-	many	polygon, polyhedron, polygamy
post-	after	postfix, postpone, postscript
pre-	before	predict, prepare, preview, preschool, prewrite, prefix
preter-	beyond, past, more than	pretermit, preternatural
pro-	for, substitute, deputy	proconsul
pro-	before	procambium
pros-	toward	prosthesis, prostrate, prose
proto-	first, original	protoplasm, prototype
pseudo-	false, imitation	pseudonym, pseudomorph
pyro-	fire	pyrokinetic, pyrotechnic
quadri-	four	quadrilateral, quadrinomial
quasi-	partly, almost, appearing to be but not really	quasi-religious
retro-	backwards	retrograde
semi-	half	semicircle, semiserious
socio-	society, social, sociological	sociopath
sub-, sup-	below, under	submarine, subterranean, suburban, support
super-	above, over	supervisor, superintendent
supra-	above, over	suprarenal
sur-	above, over	surreal, surrender, surplus
syn-, sy-, syl-, sym-	together, with	syllable, symbol, synthesis, system
tele-	at a distance	telegraph, telephone, telescope, television
trans-	across, over	transatlantic, transverse, transform
tri-	three	tricycle, tripartite, triangle, tricolor, trinomial
ultra-	beyond	ultramagnetic, ultrasonic, ultraviolet
uni-	one, consisting of only one	unicycle, universal
vice-	deputy	vice-president, vice-principal, vice-admiral

=== Archaic ===
Prefix	Meaning	Example
gain-	against	gainsay
umbe-	around	umbestound
y-	inflectional prefix	yclad, yclept (both archaic words)

== See also ==
- Number prefix
- English grammar
- English compound
- Affix
- List of Greek and Latin roots in English

== Bibliography ==
- Adams, Valerie. (1973). An introduction to modern English word-formation. London: Longman.
- Ayers, Donald M. (1986). English words from Latin and Greek elements (2nd & rev. ed.). Tucson: The University of Arizona Press.
- Bauer, Laurie. (1983). English word-formation. Cambridge: Cambridge University Press.
- Bauer, Laurie; Lieber, Rochelle; Plag, Ingo (2013). The Oxford Reference Guide to English Morphology. Oxford, UK: Oxford University Press.
- Brown, Roland W. (1927). Materials for word-study: A manual of roots, prefixes, suffixes and derivatives in the English language. New Haven, CT: Van Dyck & Co.
- Cannon, Garland Hampton. (1987). Historical change and English word-formation: Recent vocabulary. New York: P. Lang.
- Jespersen, Otto. (1942). A modern English grammar on historical principles: Morphology (Part 6). London: George Allen & Unwin and Ejnar Munksgaard.
- Marchand, Hans. (1969). The categories and types of present-day English word-formation (2nd ed.). München: C. H. Beck.
- Quirk, Randolph; Greenbaum, Sidney; Leech, Geoffrey; & Svartvik, Jan. (1985). Appendix I: Word-formation. In A comprehensive grammar of the English language (pp. 1517–1585). Harlow: Longman.
- Simpson, John (Ed.). (1989). Oxford English dictionary (2nd ed.). Oxford: Oxford University Press.
