= Golan Heights wind farm =

Wind farm in the Golan Heights

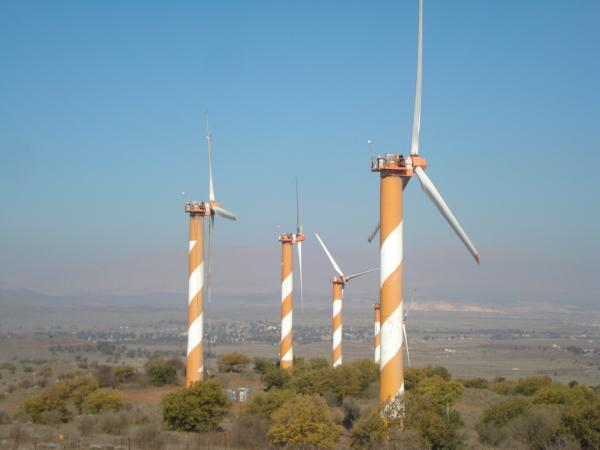
- Country: Israel; Syria
- Location: Mount Bnei Rasan
- Coordinates: 33°05′00″N 35°50′00″E
- Status: Operational
- Commission date: 1992
- Owner: Mey Eden

Wind farm
- Type: Onshore
- Site elevation: 1,050 m (3,445 ft)

Power generation
- Make and model: Floda 600
- Nameplate capacity: 10 MW

External links
- Commons: Related media on Commons

The Golan Heights wind farm is a wind farm located 1,050 m above sea level on Mount Bnei Rasan 5 km south of Quneitra in the Israeli-occupied Golan Heights.

== History ==
The wind farm was built in 1992 by the Mey Eden (Waters of Eden) the Middle East. Installation commenced after an extensive wind resource assessment carried out in 20 sites in the Golan Heights for about three years.

The farm operates 10 Floda 600 wind turbines, generating 6 MW in total. The energy is consumed by the Mey Eden plant, the Golan Heights Winery and about 20,000 people. The remaining energy is fed into the electrical grid.

== Development plans ==
Mey Golan was granted a license to build a $500 million and 400 MW wind farm. The project consists of about 150 turbines over an area of 140 km^{2} in the northeastern Golan Heights, from the Druze village Majdal Shams to moshav Alonei HaBashan. The partnership between Mey Golan and US energy giant AES Corporation is worth $600 million.

According to the Israeli Foreign Ministry a number of wind farms are planned in the Galilee, the Arava and the Negev. Towards this end, work is being done to identify wind-intensive sites and set up licensing assistance to wind farm developers.

== See also ==
- Israel Electric Corporation
