= Mount Bental/Tal Al-Gharam =

Dormant volcano in the Golan Heights

- جبل بنطل, جبل الغرام (in Arabic) הר בנטל (in Hebrew)
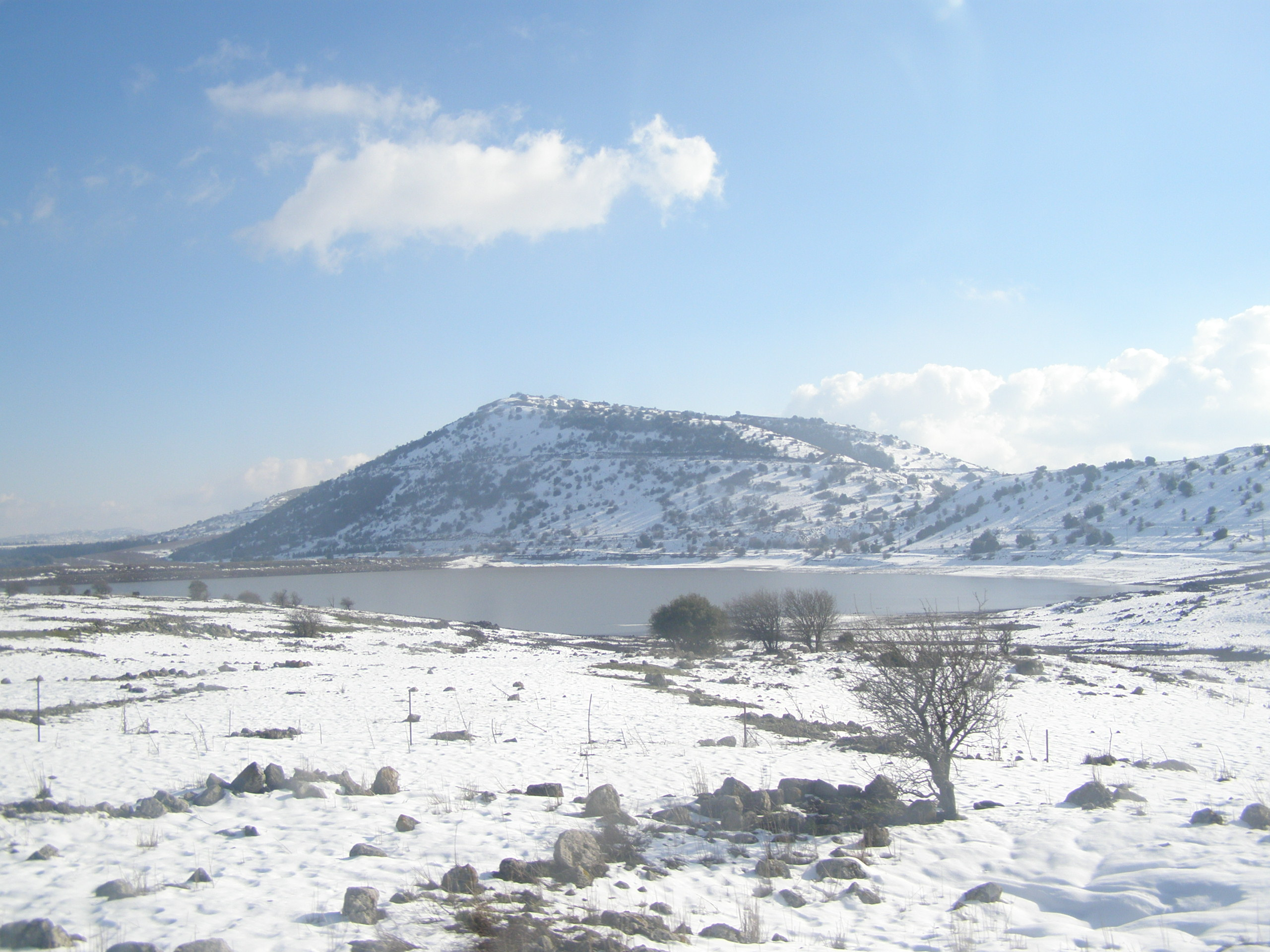
- Mount Bental

Highest point
- Elevation: 1,171 m (3,842 ft)
- Listing: Mountains in the Golan Heights
- Coordinates: 33°7′41″N 35°47′8″E

Geography
- Location within the Golan Heights Location within the Golan Heights
- Location: Golan Heights

Geology
- Mountain type: Volcano

Mount Bental (Arabic: جبل بنطل, جبل الغرام / ALA-LC: Jabal al-Gharam / "Mountain of Lust" "Jabal Bental"; Hebrew: הר בנטל, Har Bental, "Mount Bental" (lit. "Son of Dew") is a dormant volcano in the North-Eastern part of the Golan Heights, It extends to an elevation of 1,171 meters above sea level.

== Geology ==
The mountain is a part of a chain of dormant volcanic mountains spanning along the eastern part of the Golan Heights starting from Mount Ram in the north and ending on Tal Saki in the south. It is the northern neighbor of Mount Avital which shares the same volcanic magma source with it. Mount Bental was formed in a volcanic eruption that formed a scoria volcanic cone when the magma that tried to erupt from Mount Avital's top could not do so, and the pressure led to an eruption of the western side of Mount Avital and of Mount Bental.

== The mountain ==
Mount Bental is covered with Quercus calliprinos trees and on its top is an IDF stronghold which was built on an older Syrian stronghold, which is an attraction point for visitors. The mountaintop has a good view of the Syrian lands, Mount Hermon, and the Golan Heights.

The Hebrew name of the mountain, "son of dew", is by analogy to its higher neighbor Mount Avital whose name means "father of dew" (a loan translation from Arabic "Tel Abu Nada").

Merom Golan is located at the bottom of the volcanic crater.

== Attractions ==
The mountain sits at the top of a car trail where hikers can stop and buy local Druze treats and food and eat at the Coffee Anan restaurant, a pun on the former UN secretary's name, as anan means "cloud" in Hebrew and the restaurant is on the peak of the mountain. On the mountain are two trails, one above ground, and one under. The underground trail is an old IDF bunker that tells the story of the Yom Kippur war in wall art. At the end of both trails is an UN observation post.
