= List of mountains in the Golan Heights =

This is a list of mountains in the Golan Heights, Syrian territory (Quneitra Governorate) under Israeli occupation.

Name	Height	Coordinates	Notes
Mount Hermon (Arabic: جبل الشيخ, Jabal el-Shaykh, Hebrew: הר חרמון, Har Hermon)	2,814 metres (9,232 ft)	33°24′58″N 35°51′27″E	Parts of Mount Hermon's southern slopes fall within the northern Golan Heights.
Mount Hermonit (Hebrew: הר חרמונית, Har Hermonit)	1,216 metres (3,990 ft)	33°11′7″N 35°47′38″E	An inactive volcano in the northern Golan Heights.
Mount Baron (Hebrew: הר בראון, Har Baron)	1,056 metres (3,465 ft)	33°9′30″N 35°46′45″E	Part of an extinct volcano in the northeastern Golan Heights.
Mount Hozek (Hebrew: הר חוזק, Har Hozek)	1,158 metres (3,799 ft)	33°03′14″N 35°51′01″E	Part of an extinct volcano in the eastern Golan Heights.
Mount Ram (Hebrew: הר רם, Har Ram, lit. High Mountain)	1,188 metres (3,898 ft)	33°14′43″N 35°47′02″E	Part of an extinct volcano in the northern Golan Heights.
Mount Shifon (Hebrew: הר שיפון, Har Shifon)	977 metres (3,205 ft)	33°04′10″N 35°46′08″E	Part of an extinct volcano in the northeastern the Golan Heights.
Mount Odem/Ras al-Ahmar (Hebrew: הר אודם, Har Odem, lit. Ruby Mountain, Arabic: رأس الأحمر, Ras al-Ahmar)	1,100 metres (3,600 ft)	33°11′55″N 35°45′15″E	Part of an extinct volcano in the northern Golan Heights.
Tall al-Faras/Mount Peres (Arabic: تل الفرس, Tall al-Faras, Hebrew: הר פרס, Har Peres)	929 metres (3,048 ft)	32°57′34″N 35°51′50″E	Volcanic mountain located in central Golan Heights.
Mount Avital/Tall Abu an Nada (Hebrew: הר אביטל, Har Avital, Arabic: تل أبو الندى, Tall Abu an Nada)	1,204 metres (3,950 ft)	33°06′38″N 35°47′45″E	Part of an extinct volcano in the northeastern Golan Heights.
Mount Bental/Tal Al-Gharam (Hebrew: הר בנטל, Har Bental, Arabic: تل الغرام, Tal Al-Gharam)	1,171 metres (3,842 ft)	33°07′45″N 35°47′09″E	Part of an extinct volcano in the northeastern Golan Heights.
Mount Bnei Rasan/Tall al Ghassaniyah (Hebrew: הר בני רסן, Har Bnei Rasan, Arabic: تلّ الغسانية, Tall al Ghassaniyah)	1,072 metres (3,517 ft)	33°04′49″N 35°50′04″E	Part of an extinct volcano in the eastern Golan Heights. Atop the mountain is the Golan Heights Wind Farm.
Tall al Makhfi (Arabic: تل المخفي, Tall al Makhfi)	1,055 metres (3,461 ft)	33°08′0″N 35°48′0″E	Mountain in the northeastern Golan Heights, north of Quneitra.
Mount Varda/Tall Wardah (Hebrew: הר ורדה, Har Varda, lit. Rose Mountain, Arabic: تل وردة, Tall Wardah)	1,226 metres (4,022 ft)	33°12′40″N 35°47′20″E	Part of an extinct volcano in the northern Golan Heights.
Mount Yosifon/Tall Yusuf (Hebrew: הר יוסיפון, Har Yosifon, Arabic: تل يوسف, Tall Yusuf)	981 metres (3,219 ft)	33°03′24″N 35°47′49″E	Part of an extinct volcano in the central Golan Heights.
Mount Hermonit/Tell al-Sheikh (Hebrew: הר חרמונית, Har Hermonit, Arabic: تل الشيخ, Tell al-Sheikh)	1,211 metres (3,973 ft)	33°10′55″N 35°47′39″E	Part of an extinct volcano in the northern Golan Heights.
Givat Orha/Tel Jukhdar (Hebrew: גבעת אורחה, Givat Orha, Arabic: تل جوخدار, Tel Jukhdar)	646 metres (2,119 ft)	32°55′39″N 35°51′09″E	Hill in southeastern Golan Heights.
Mount Kramim/Tell Sader al-Arus (Hebrew: הר כרמים, Har Kramim, lit. Vineyards Mountain, Arabic: تل صدر العروس, Tell Sader al-Arus)	1,198 metres (3,930 ft)	33°13′06″N 35°46′32″E	Part of an extinct volcano in northern Golan Heights.
Tell Saki (Hebrew: תל א-סאקי, Tell a-Saki, Arabic: تل الساقي), Tell al-Saki)	594 metres (1,949 ft)	32°51′58″N 35°49′50″E	Small extinct volcano in southern Golan Heights.

== Pictures ==
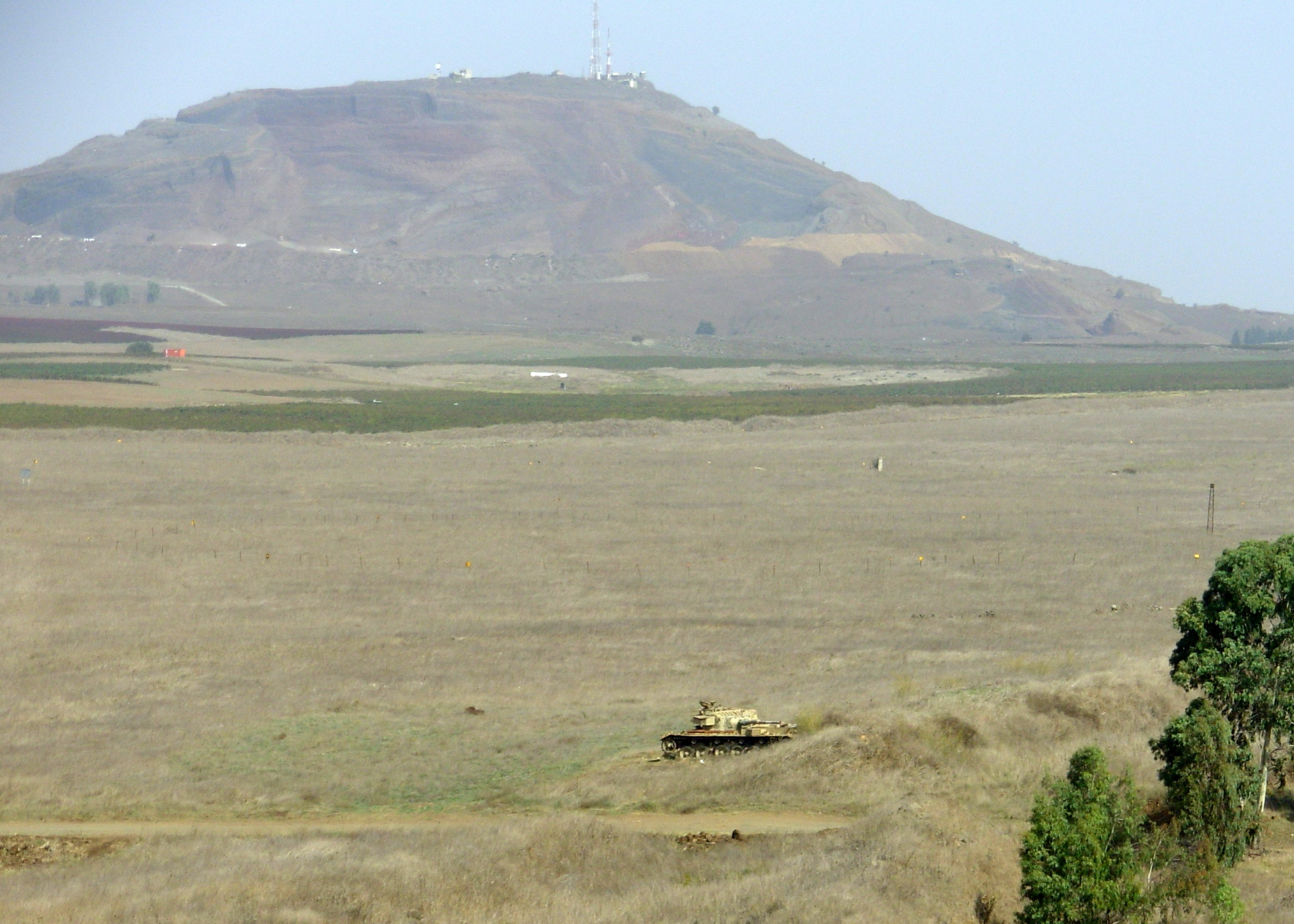
Mount Peres/Tall al-Faras

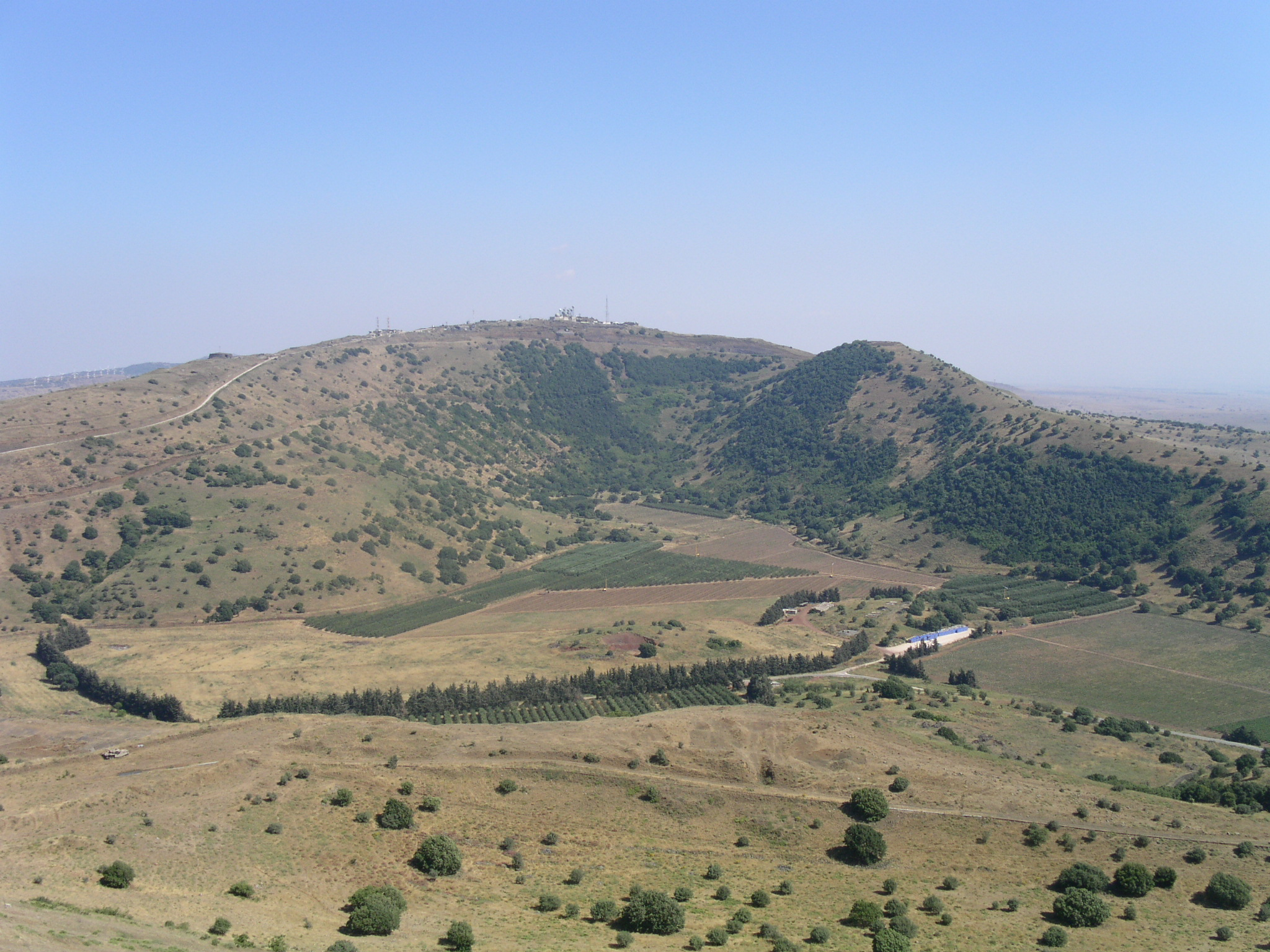
Mount Avital/Tall Abu an Nada

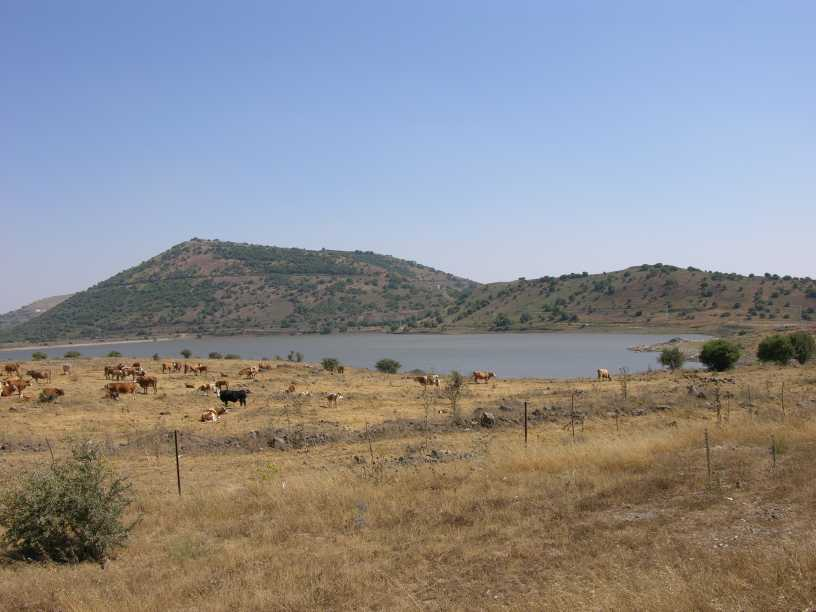
Mount Bental/Tal Al-Gharam

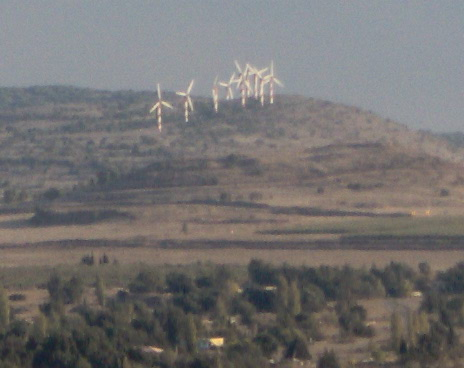
Mount Bnei Rasan/Tall al Ghassaniyah

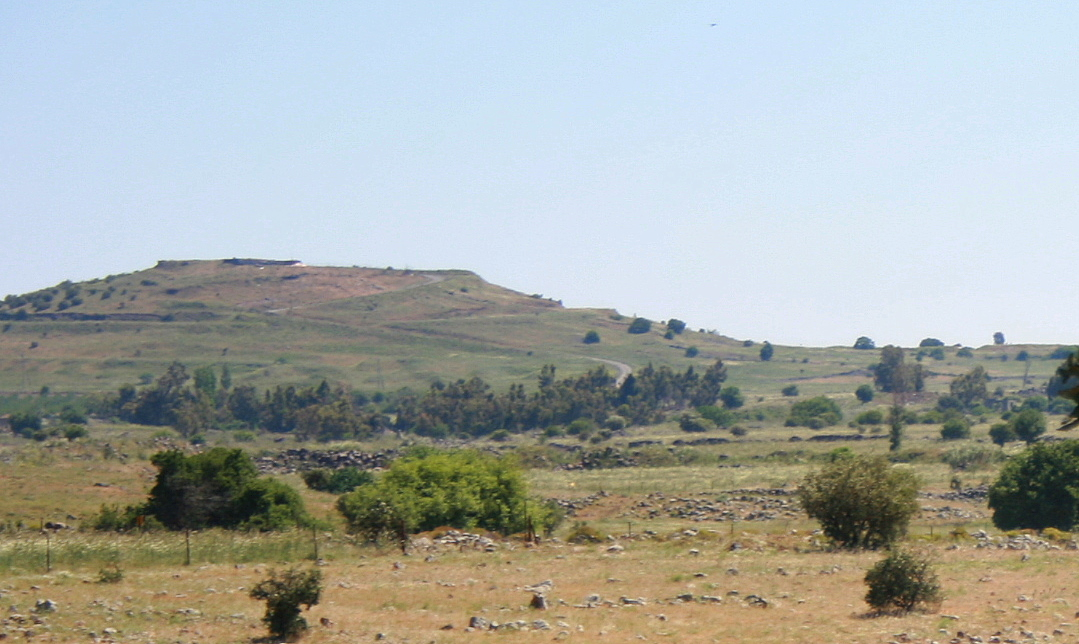
Mount Yosifon/Tall Yusuf

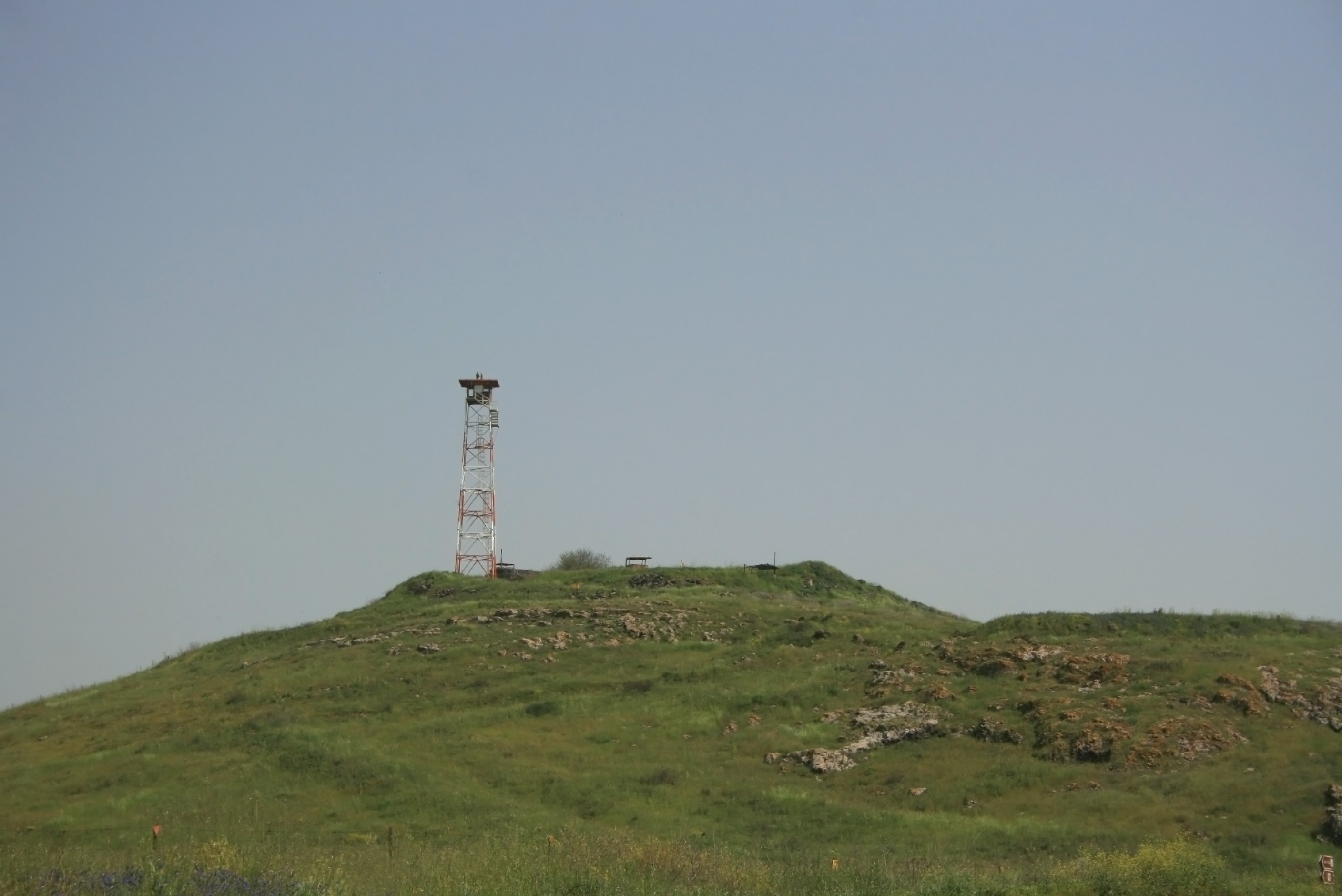
Givat Orha/Tel Jukhdar

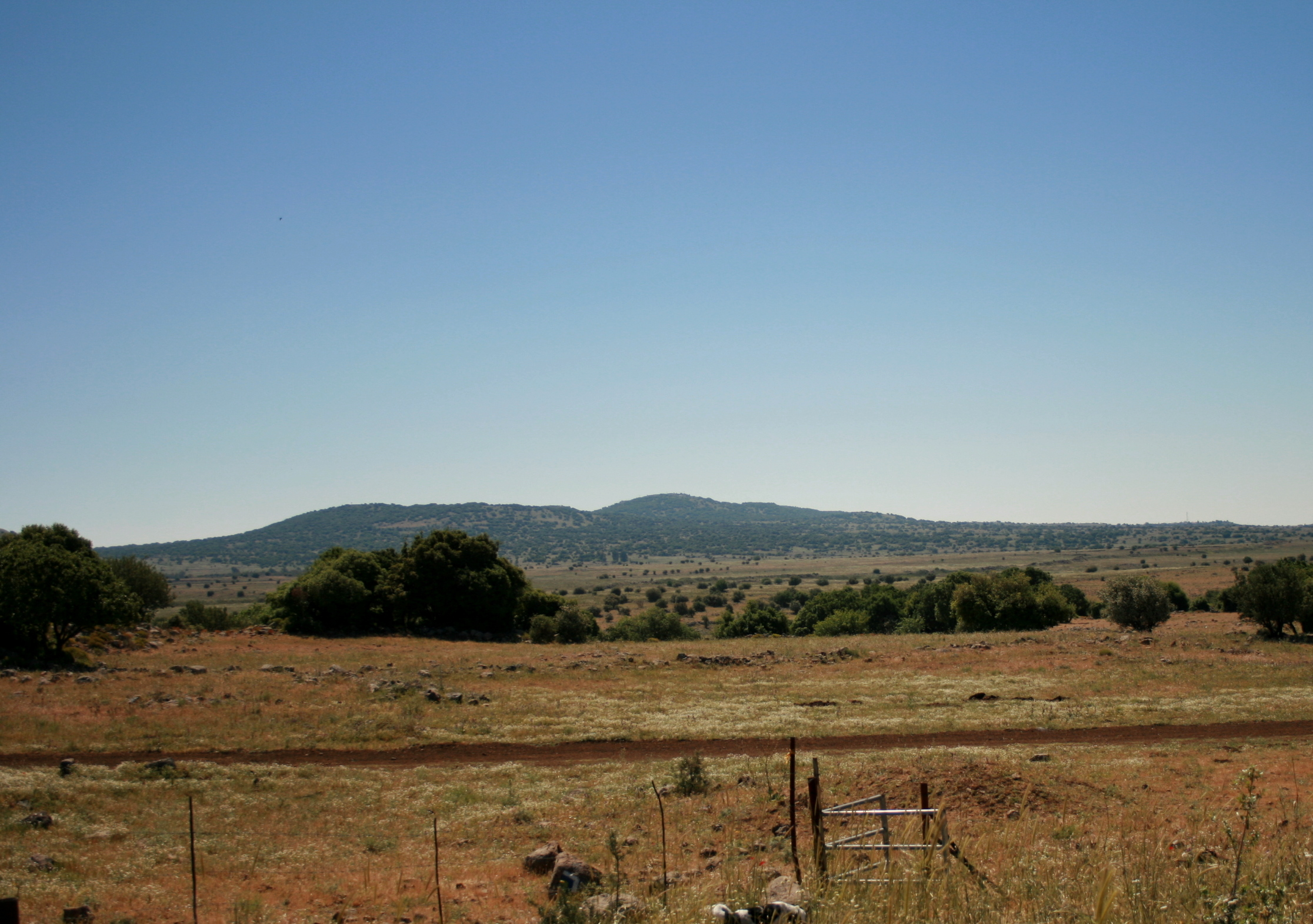
Mount Hosek
