= Alon Mindlin =

Israeli chess player (born 1996)

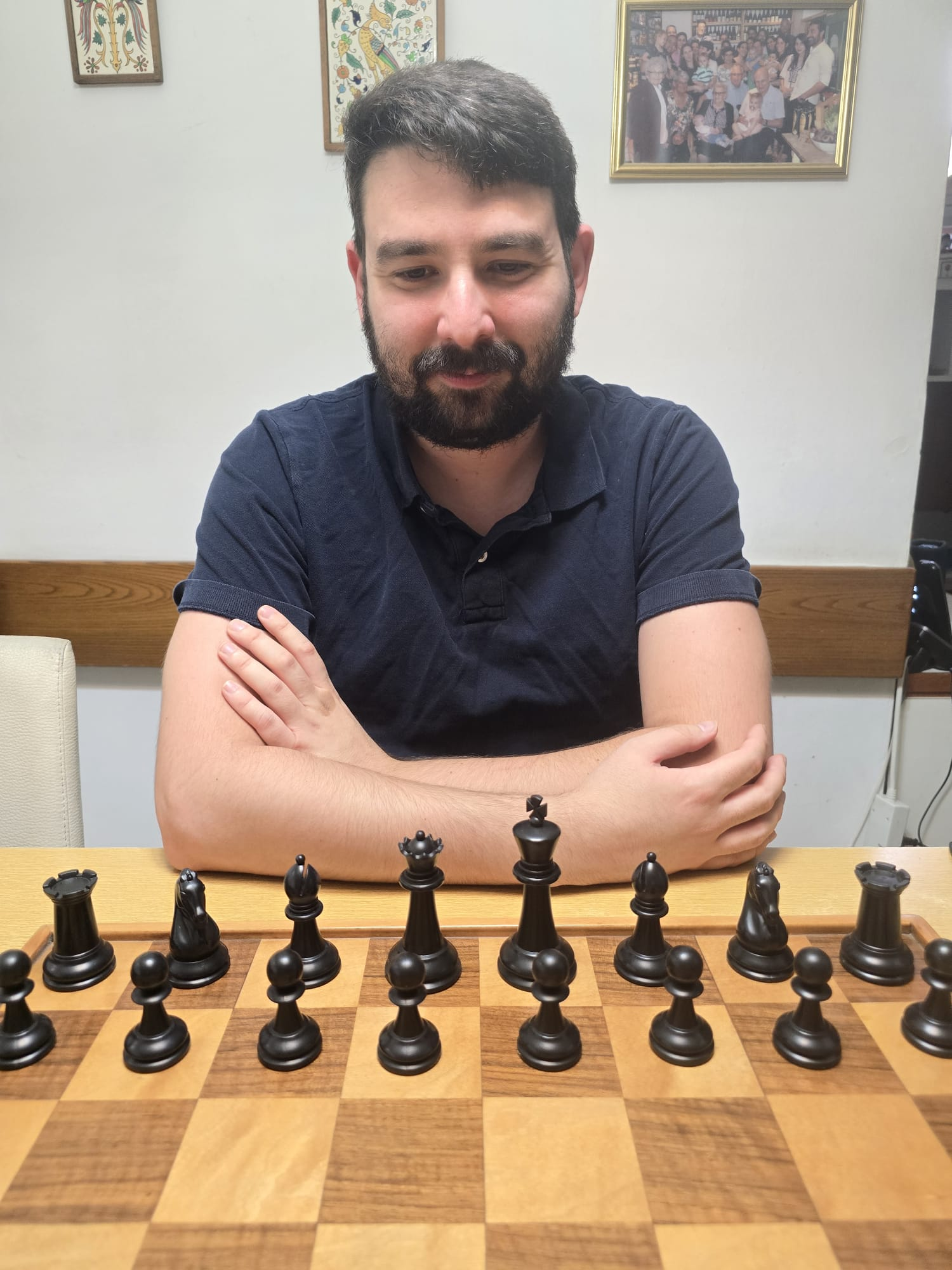
- Mindlin in 2024

Personal information
- Born: December 21, 1996 (age 29)

Chess career
- Country: Israel
- Title: International Master (2016)
- FIDE rating: 2461 (October 2026)
- Peak rating: 2472 (August 2018)

Alon Mindlin (Hebrew: אלון מינדלין; born 21 December 1996) is an International chess master, Israeli youth champion and entrepreneur in the field of chess.

== Chess career ==
As of November 2024, Mindlin ranked among the 90 best players on Chess.com, and has a victory over Grandmaster Hikaru Nakamura and Grandmaster Magnus Carlsen.

- International chess master from 2016
- National League player in the Kfar Saba team, and was a part of many achievements including winning the 2nd and 3rd places in the league and took part in the European Club Championships several times, winning the State Cup in 2016, and a large number of wins in the National Youth Team Championships.
- 2004 - Second place in the Israeli National Championship up to the age of 8
- 2005 - Second place in the Israeli National Championship up to the age of 9
- 2006 - Third place in the Israeli National Championship under the age of 10
- 2007 - Second place in the Israeli National Championship up to the age of 11
- 2008 - Israeli National champion up to the age of 13
- 2009 - Second place in the Israeli National Championship up to the age of 13
- 2011 - Second place in the Israeli National Championship under the age of 16, Winning the 2011 age 18 teams championship with 5.5/6
- 2012 - Winning the 2012 age 18 teams championship with 5.0/6
- 2013 - Second place in the Israeli National Championship up to the age of 18, Winning the 2013 age 18 teams championship with 6.5/7, Participated in the 29th European Club Cup 2013
- In December 2013, represented Israel at the World Youth Championship in Al-Ain, Abu Dhabi as part of a limited delegation that included outstanding youth players that made history: for the first time Israel was represented in a chess competition in an Arab country
- 2014 - Winning the 2014 age 18 teams championship with 6.0/7
- 2015 - Finished in 2nd place in the First Saturday Budapest 2015 December chess tournament Budapest, Hungary
- 2016 - National champion under the age of 20, Winning the 2016 Israeli Cup with 4.0/5. Other players in the team were Avital Boruchovsky and Tamir Nabaty.
- 2017 - Bronze medal in the Grandmasters competition in the Maccabiah Games in Jerusalem
- 2020 - Third place in the Israeli league in 2020 with 5.5/9
- 2022 - Silver medal in the Blitz games of the Maccabiah competition in Jerusalem, Second place in the Israeli league in 2022 with 6.0/9, Participated in the 37th European Chess Club Cup 2022
- 2024 - Second place in the Israeli league in 2024 with 6.5/9, Participated in the 39th European Chess Club Cup

== Achievements as an entrepreneur ==
- Head of delegation and coach of the Israeli national youth team to the World Chess Championship (2018), aged 21 years
- In 2023, in cooperation between TechMate and the cyber company Orca Security, an event called Hackmate was organized—the chess championship of cyber and cloud companies, which included 18 of the largest teams in Israel and the world and ended with Cisco's victory.
- During the year 2023, together with the fintech unicorn Earnix, Mindlin organized a group chess championship for Israeli fintech companies that ended with the victory of the Payoneer company and included 11 leading companies in the field. In July 2023 Mindlin collaborated with the Nova measuring instruments company that hosted a unique team championship that included 7 leading companies in the science park in Rehovot.
- In 2024, as part of The Tech Gambit events, the largest Israeli high-tech championship to date was organized with 55 companies taking part. The competition was held at the Pearl-Cohen Law Firm under the sponsorship of Fireblocks, and began with 2 groups from which 14 teams qualified for the finals, ending with Intel winning 1st place.
- The Tech Gambit Championship - The 2025 Team High-Tech Championship broke records with 86 companies participating in the event, which was held in collaboration with TechMate, Intuit, and Sony Semiconductor Israel. The competition ended with Apple winning, beating Moovit and Istra Research. Mindlin started writing a weekly column called "This Week in Chess" in Ice magazine.
