= Art versus Nonart: Art out of Mind =

2003 book by Tsion Avital

- Author: Tsion Avital
- Publisher: Cambridge University Press
- Publication date: 2003

Art versus Nonart: Art out of Mind is a book by Professor Tsion Avital, published by Cambridge University Press in 2003 and translated and published in Chinese by The Commercial Press, Beijing in 2009. In 2018 it was translated and published in Spanish by Vernon Press, Washington.

== Themes ==
In the first part of the book (Chapters 1-4) Avital examines from various angles the question "Is modern art actually art?". In this section Avital analyzes and criticizes modern art, and claims that all non-figurative art created in the 20th century is not in fact art, but rather the shreds and raw materials of the figurative art that preceded it, or at best, trivial design. Avital's criticism is based on a new, general and coherent system of criteria which anchors the nature of art and culture in the structural properties of mind. The discussion of the system of criteria takes up most of the second part of the book (chapters 5, 6, 8). In light of the new system of criteria he indicates the necessary conditions that any new paradigm for art of the future must fulfill in order to be really relevant to art. In the viewpoint presented in the book, modern art is only a chaotic interim stage between the art of the past which has already maximized its potential, and the art of the future which is not yet here, but whose outline can be identified.

== Summary ==
In chapter one, Avital argues that many books and articles have pointed out various negative aspects of modernism. Avital's book claims that art is in much deeper trouble because it is in the first paradigmatic crisis in its history, which essentially resembles the first paradigmatic crisis in science in the 17th century transition from Aristotelian to Galilean physics. In contrast to the common perception, Avital writes of the intellectual revolutions and the deep and influential cultural processes which occurred in Western culture in the last five hundred and fifty years, which changed our way of thinking in a manner which is no longer compatible with the way of thinking which is visual, fundamental to figurative art, which therefore had to decline. Avital presents the radical thesis that non-figurative art is not art at all, but only a necessary intermediate stage between the art of the past and that of the future, while modernism itself is not art but rather the dismantling of the old art. The second chapter includes Avital's claim that the totality of modern art is based on a logical fallacy which is common in nature and culture among human beings, animals of all levels and even plants. This failure is called the fallacy of affirming the consequence. In the third chapter, Avital presents a survey and analysis of the history of the concept of abstraction over 2300 years, and claims that the fathers of modernism erred completely in their understanding and usage of the term "abstraction." The fourth chapter criticizes certain conceptions or theories of aesthetics in the twentieth century, which in Avital's view only pretend to extend the concept of art, but in fact they serve the modern art establishment by fitting the definition of art to that which the establishment desires, in particular the art dealers. This chapter presents the claim that aesthetics has totally failed in its attempt to define art.

The fifth, sixth and eighth chapters respectively show how each of the mindprints, such as Connectivity-Disconnectivity, Hierarchy-Randomness, Symmetry-Asymmetry, enable one to distinguish art from non-art. For example, a painting depicting a horse presents a graphical common denominator between all horses of the same type.

At the end of the book there is a ten-page summary table contrasting figurative and nonrepresentational art in light of about fifty characteristics that appear in figurative art but do not appear or appear in a distorted fashion in nonrepresentational art.

== The book ==
- Avital. T. (2003). Art versus Nonart : Art out of Mind. Cambridge University Press, Cambridge. (445 pages)
  - The book has been published in Chinese by The Commercial Press, Translated by Wang Zuzhe, Beijing, 2009.
    - 齐安·亚菲塔（Tsion Avital），2009年，《艺术对飞艺术》，北京：商务印书馆，译者王祖哲，山东大学文学院
  - The book has been published in Spanish: Arte vs. No-Arte: Arte fuera de la mente, Translated by Sandra Luz Patarroyo Rodríguez. Malaga; Vernon Press, 2018.
