= Drosometer =

A drosometer (from Classical Greek δρόσος, drosos, dew + μέτρον, metron, measure) is an apparatus for measuring the quantity of dew formed in a unit of time per unit area of surface.

== Description ==
The surface may be either a horizontal metal plate or a leaf hanging naturally, or a bit of wool or cotton representing a large surface of fine fibres. The unit of time is usually one hour, and the measurement is made in the early morning, before the rising sun evaporates the dew. When the apparatus is made self-registering, the surface, with its accumulating dew, hangs at one end of a delicate balance, or from a delicate spiral metallic spring, and by its gradual sinking moves the index that makes the record on a moving sheet of paper.

== Shortcomings ==
Although many forms have been suggested, yet none have been considered to give results that are comparable with each other from day to day, owing largely to the fact that the slightest change in the surface that receives the moisture alters the quantity of dew that is caught. Even the same bit of wool, when used day after day, changes its nature in this respect. If a metallic surface is used, its behavior must be compared frequently with a standard, partly because different metals have different properties, but principally because the same surface, when it becomes greasy, dirty, or scratched, has different properties.

Many peculiarities of the deposition of dew on different objects are explained in detail in the popular work by Charles Tomlinson, entitled The Dew-drop and the Mist (London, 1860). Moreover, the case of the natural deposition of dew on the grass and other plants very near the surface of the ground is not at all parallel to that where it is deposited upon metal plates or other bodies used as drosometers, partly because of the location, partly because of the difference in the substances, and largely because of the influence of slight local currents of air.
