= Tsion Avital =

Israeli philosopher of art and culture

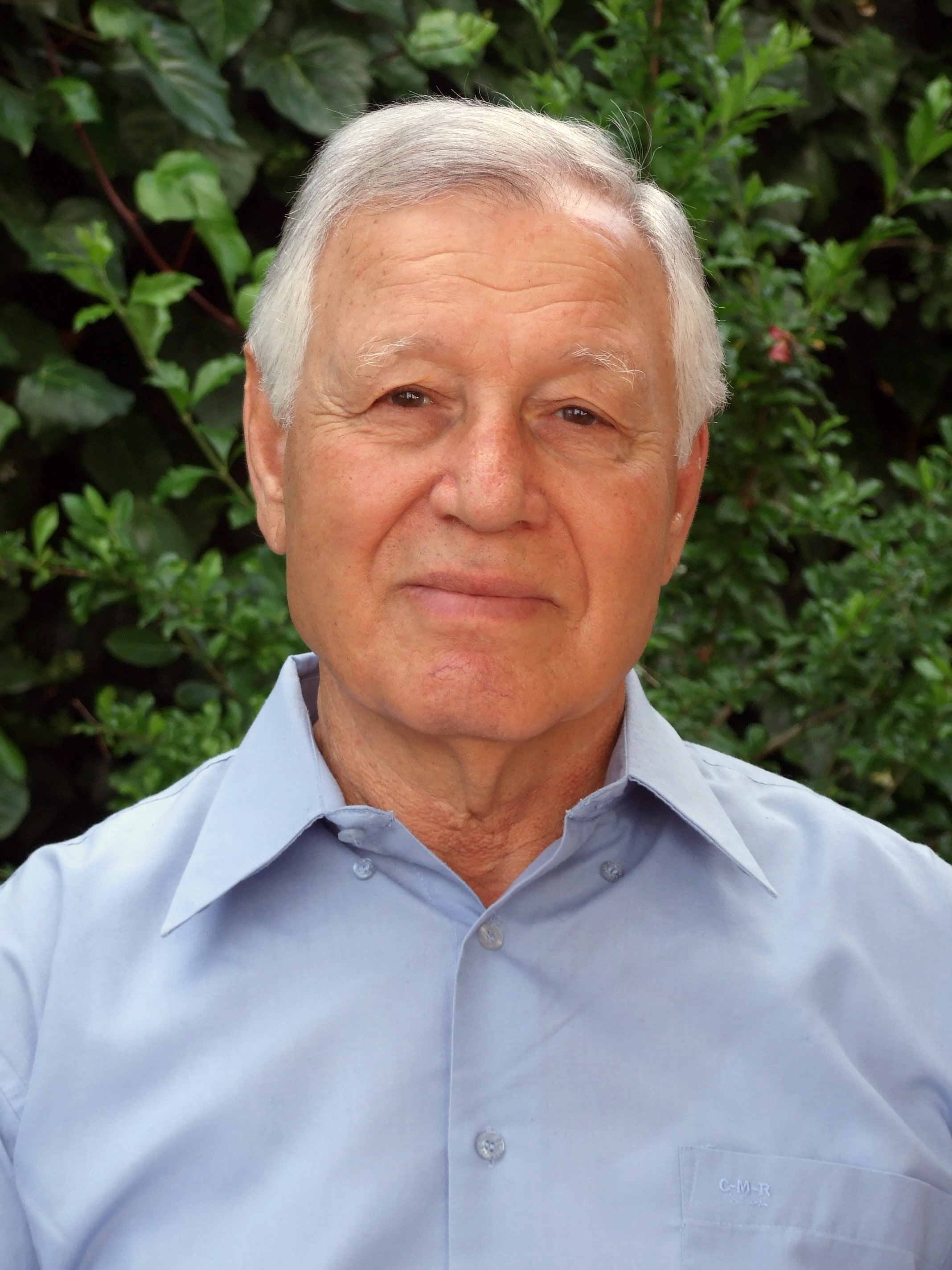
Tsion Avital

Tsion Avital (Hebrew: ציון אביטל; born February 21, 1940) is an Israeli philosopher of art and culture.

== Biography ==
Tsion Avital was born to Avraham and Preciada Dorit Avitbol Avital, and grew up in the town of Sefrou in Morocco. Avital immigrated to Israel with his family in January 1951, when he was eleven. He studied philosophy and psychology at Hebrew University of Jerusalem, and then pursued an MA in philosophy focusing on aesthetics, taking additional courses in the Department of Art History. His master's thesis, "An Outline of Artonomy," was supervised by Yehuda Elkana and Eddy Zemach. While studying for his doctorate, he spent 1971–1972 at the University of Toronto in Canada. In the experimental aesthetics lab headed by Daniel Berlyne, he was able to verify his hypotheses on the structural paradigm in art. His doctoral dissertation, on "Artonomy: a new type of art and its implications for art education in the future" (1974), was supervised by Berlyne and Anatol Rapoport of the University of Toronto, and Moshe Caspi of Hebrew University.

== Academic career ==
In 1973 Avital was appointed lecturer at Hebrew University. In 1976 he stopped teaching and managed a rubber and plastics plant in the Holon Industrial Zone for five years. In 1982 he resumed teaching at the Faculty of Design at HIT, the Holon Institute of Technology. In 1997 he was appointed Senior Lecturer, in 1999 was granted tenure and in 2003 appointed Full Professor. In 2011 he retired as Emeritus Professor at the Holon Technological Institute.

Tsion Avital is divorced and has three children.

== Artonomy research ==
In his doctoral dissertation Avital claimed that modern art or, all visual non-representational art, both in painting and sculpture, is not art at all, because its works are completely arbitrary compositions, and so they lack a systemic structure which has been the central characteristic of art in the 40,000 years of its existence. He claimed that in order to revive art, a new type of art is needed, that would restore a systemic structure to art, but without returning to figurative art which had been exhausted. He called this art "Artonomy". Actually, from a higher point of view, figurative art and artonomy are the two sides of the same coin: one semantically or content-oriented and the other structure oriented. The decisive importance he attributes to the hierarchical structure in art derives from the fact that hierarchy is a universal ordering relation, and is the most general principle of order existing in the universe at all levels: macro and micro, in the physical, biological, social and noetic world.

Avital thinks that Figurative art served as an adequate and comprehensible depiction of things, real or fictitious, for tens of thousands of years just because it represented things in the world in a hierarchical order employing self-embedded pictorial symbols. From the moment that hierarchical order was erased from art, it also ceased to be a medium for the depiction of reality or anything else, and became arbitrary daubing of paint or at best, trivial graphic design. We have no difficulty in understanding prehistoric art from 32,000 years ago, but we are unable to understand any "abstract" painting made today. Avital's central research hypothesis was that if we expose test subjects who know nothing of systemic thought to a set of non-figurative paintings whose relationship is systemic, the subjects would be able to identify the correct order of the pictures comprising the system even if these were presented to them in random order. The hypothesis was tested in three different experiments, all of which showed that indeed subjects with no prior knowledge of the subject succeeded, consciously or unconsciously, in reconstructing the correct order of the visual systems that had been presented to them in a random order which differed for each subject. The tests results confirmed Avital's hypothesis above all expectation, thus indirectly supporting Avital's mindprints theory.

Between the years 1974–1985 Avital initiated a number of exhibitions in Israel in which the principles of Artonomy in various arts were demonstrated, by Avital as well as other artists. It is worth noting that while all scholars who employ structuralism in their fields use it as an explicative method.

Avital argue that artonomy seem to be the only case in which structuralism is applied for both; explicative and generative method in art. Before the formulation of artonomy by Avital, there was a premature attempt to introduce systemic thinking in art. In 1966 the Guggenheim Museum in New York presented an exhibition entitled "Systemic Art".

Avital argue that the terms "system" and "systemic" were used without being understood, as so often happens in art. All the works presented at the exhibition were at most series rather than systems. Indeed, in any system a serial effect may exist, but not every series constitutes a system. The difference is that there is no necessary connection between constituents of a series, but there is a necessary connection between all constituents of a system. An additional difference is that in a series there is no necessary layering or hierarchy between constituents of the series, while in a system there necessarily exists layering between constituents of the system. Claiming that visual non-figurative art, or simply, "abstract" art, is not art, made it obligatory for Avital to propose a sound characterization of true art but he found none in the history of aesthetics. After his total disillusionment with aesthetics theory and years of groping in the dark with no solution, Avital decided to look in a completely different direction: to investigate in prehistory how art was born, in the hope that in its fetal stages it would be easier to discern its most basic characteristics. After over twenty years of groping in the dark with no solution, a significant turning point for him was the discovery by Mary Leakey and other researchers who discussed the discovery of a trail of footprints left by hominids in Laetoli, in the north of Tanzania, 3.8 million years ago. These footprints show a remarkable phenomenon: on the path at one time a male, a female and a child walked and the latter, as a game, made sure to step only in the footprints of the male ahead of him, even though his strides were much longer. This paper and about a hundred other papers discussing these footprints treat solely various physiological aspects of these hominids. But for Avital this finding was the key to some insights regarding the cognitive make-up of these hominids and to answer two fundamental questions: the graphic origins of art, as well as the cognitive-structural qualities necessary for something to be a work of art.

In his paper "Footprints Literacy: The Origins of Art and Prelude to Science" Avital showed that hominids about four million years ago apparently knew how to read footprints, something no other creature is able to do to this day save humans. Second, he showed why reading of footprints is apparently the origin of painting, as well as the first case where meta-structures of the mind find expression. Thus Avital has anchored the origins and meaning of art in mind itself and in this respect his theory is very different from other well-known theories as those presented by Breuil, Gombrich, Davis.

The same meta-structures of mind or mindprints reappear along the evolution of culture: tool making, language and all of the cultural domains but on ever higher levels of abstraction. Understanding of the cognitive mechanisms necessary for reading the footprints led to Avital's most important finding: mindprints theory and they are the central axis of all his life's research. Avital assumes that these are the basic organizational structural tools of the mind, and find expression in all branches of culture through all time, and that apparently these organizational structures, at some level, exist in plants and animals as well. Avital claims that these mindprints that were necessary to read footprints four million years ago, and are necessary today to read footprints, are the same qualities necessary for making stone tools 2.6 million years ago, prehistoric art, language and its derivatives, technology and science.

A tentative table of mindprints

1. Connectivity–Disconnectivity (Codis) (Unity–Plurality)

2. Open-Endedness–Closed-Endedness

3. Recursiveness (Recurrence)–Singularity (“One-off")

4. Transformation–Invariance

5. Hierarchy–Randomness (Anti-hierarchy, Disorder)

6. Symmetry–Asymmetry

7. Negation–Affirmation (Double Negation)

8. Complementarity–Mutual Exclusiveness

9. Comparison–Imparison (No Comparison?)

10. Determinism–Indeterminism (Probability, Selection, Choice)

Over time, the level of abstraction and sophistication in the application of these patterns became more and more complex. Similarly, awareness of the existence of these organizational patterns grew throughout the development of culture. In this paper Avital claims that the evolution of culture is to a large extent the evolution of levels of application of mindprints. To make the matter concrete, he demonstrates and compares the appearance of mindprints in reading footprints 3.8 million years ago: prehistoric art from its beginning 40,000 years ago, and modern science today. In contrast, in modern art these organizational patterns are in part lacking, and in part appear in a distorted or ruined condition. That is, in modern art the structural skeleton that held art together over tens of thousands of years is lacking, and therefore this is not art at all, but rather the debris of the figurative art which modernism broke into shreds. For example, the footprint of a deer of some particular age, sex and physical condition relates or connects all deer of the same kind, but also differentiates them from other animals. The prehistoric painting of a horse relates all horses of the same kind, but also separates them from other animals. Newton's law of gravity shows the force of attraction between any two masses as a function of the magnitude of their masses and the square of the distance between them. In contrast, argue Avital, abstract art does not relate any things, but is a special case of a mass of colors and forms with no reference outside themselves. Similarly, one can show that all the other nine mindprints exist at a growing level of abstraction: in reading footprints, in figurative art and in science but not in modern art. Thus avital has anchored the nature of art in the nature of the meta-structures of mind.

== Published works ==
Avital's first book was Art versus Non art : Art out of Mind, Cambridge University Press (2003). The central issue of this book is to re-establish the demarcation lines between art and quasi-art by anchoring the nature of art, as all other main branches of culture, in the structural properties of mind itself.

In the first part of this book Avital examines the question "Is modern art actually art?" He claims that all visual nonfigurative art created in the twentieth century and in the current century is not art. In this book Avital claims that art is in the first paradigmatic crisis in its history. He claims that modernism reduced art to arbitrary compositions of color and form, and thus in fact reduced art to design. Avital also argue why the art which is labeled abstract is not abstract at all, and this is because the fathers of modernism did not understand the concept of abstraction. Avital criticizes the aestheticians, and the art establishment, who "justified the misdeed," in his view: rather than defining art in a way that would enable distinction of art from non-art, they extended the concept of art with no limit until there was no one thing, including nothing, that could not be presented as art. This state of affairs is equivalent to a state of no art, for if everything is red and nothing is not red, then there is no red.

The second part of the book presents the theory of mindprints, and shows how it can be applied in order to distinguish in a fairly clear manner between art and pseudo-art. He argues extensively how each mindprint, such as Connectivity-Disconnectivity, Symmetry-Asymmetry, Hierarchy-Randomness and others appear in every figurative painting but not in "abstract" painting. A particularly thorough discussion deals with hierarchical organization and its implications for art today and in the future. At the end of the book Avital presents a table of about fifty characteristics that existed in figurative art throughout its history, of which only two, color and form, appear in modern art as well. However these two characteristics are at most a necessary but not sufficient condition for something to be a work of art. These two characteristics are barely sufficient for something to be trivial graphic design but not art.

Avital's second book was The Confusion between Art and Design: Brain-Tools versus Body-Tools, Washington; Vernon Press (2017).

Since the beginning of the twentieth century artists have reduced figurative painting to graphic design but called it "abstract art". They also reduced figurative sculpture to object or industrial design without any instrumental function, but called their work "abstract sculpture." In both cases, the artists reduced the figurative symbols to their perceptual components; color and form, or to objects and therefore art ceased to exist as a visual language and in fact became a design of one kind or another. Indeed, artists, designers, curators at art and design museums, lecturers in academies of art and design, and certainly students in both fields, all are not really able to distinguish between the two domains. As a result of the total blurring between art and design, there is complete confusion between the two domains, which is detrimental to both fields.

The book presents a comparison of art and design in the light of about one hundred properties, and shows that in almost all cases these properties are conveyed in opposing manner in both fields. In light of these comparisons, the inevitable conclusion is that art and design are two different and independent domains of opposed character. The book demonstrates that art and design belong to two domains of two different levels of reality. Thus a painting depicting a table is a pictorial generalization or a pictorial class-name for tables, while the actual table is a particular entity. Now it is the word "table" or painting depicting a table that give meaning and existence to tables. This is why all symbols belong to second-order reality or brain-tools, while objects belong to first-order reality or body-tools. All symbols exist in noetic reality only while all objects exist in space-time reality. The starting point of both the artist and the designer is a certain image. But while the artist ascends from the image to visual symbols, the designer descends from the image or symbol to the world of objects. Hence the artist's thinking is mainly inductive, while the designer's thinking is mainly deductive. And last example: there is design in every aspect and at all levels of nature: physical, botanical and biological. But there are no symbols of any kind in nature. There is no art in nature, just as there is no philosophy, literature or science. These are just a few out of about a hundred distinctions between art and design presented in this book. Moreover, the need to establish the distinction between art and design is a necessary condition for the possibility of understanding that non-figurative visual art is not art at all but design, and therefore there is a necessity to establish a new paradigm for art in the future in order to free it from its century-long stagnation.

There is a skintight and immanent connection between all the stages of Avital’s life-time work: a. The preliminary argument that modern art is not art because it has demolished the hierarchical framework of art and therefore lost also its referential function. b. The proposal that artonomy as structural art can restore hierarchical structure in art without returning to figurative art. c. the discovery of mindprints theory which reveals the structural infra-structure of all domains of culture, including true art, and thus enabling us to distinguish between art and nonart.

== Articles ==
- Avital, T. (1974). Artonomy: a new type of art and its implications for art education in the future. Unpublished doctoral dissertation.
- Avital, T. (1996). Symmetry: The Connectivity Principle of Art. Symmetry: Culture and Science. (The Quarterly of the International Society for the Interdisciplinary Study of Symmetry). Vol. 7, No. 1, pp. 27–50.
- Avital, T. (1997a). Narrative Thinking in a Structure Oriented Culture. SPIEL – Siegener Periodicum zur Internationalen Empirischen Literaturwisessenschaft, Universitat – Gesamthochsule Siegen. 16 (1997), H. 1/2, 29–36.
- Avital, T. (1997b). Figurative Art Versus Abstract Art: Levels of Connectivity. In Emotion, Creativity, & Art, edited by L. Dorfman, C. Martindale, D. Leontiev, G. Cupchik, V. Petrov, & P. Machotka. Perm: Perm Cultural Institute, pp. 134–152.
- Avital, T. (1998b). Footprints Literacy: The Origins of Art and Prelude to Science. Symmetry: Art and Science. (The Quarterly of the International Society for the Interdisciplinary Study of Symmetry). Vol. 9, Number 1, pp. 3–46. This article is discussed at length in the entry above.
- Avital, T. (1998c). Mindprints: The Structural Shadows of Mind-Reality? Symmetry: Art and Science. (The Quarterly of the International Society for the Interdisciplinary Study of Symmetry). Vol. 9, Number 1, pp. 47–76.
- Avital, T. and G. C. Cupchik (1998). Perceiving Hierarchical Structures in Nonrepresentational Paintings. Empirical Studies of the Arts. Vol. 16(1) pp. 59–70.
- Avital. T. (2003) Art versus Nonart. Art out of Mind. Cambridge, Cambridge University Press. Cambridge: Cambridge University Press.

== Sources ==
- Ahl, V. and Allen, T.F.H. (1996). Hierarchy Theory: A Vision, Vocabulary, and Epistemology. New York: Columbia University Press.
- Alloway, L. (1966). Systemic Painting. New York: The Solomon R. Guggenheim Museum.
- Bertalanffy, L. von. (1968). General System Theory. New York, George Braziller.
- Bochner, M. Serial Art, Systems, Solipsism. in Battcock, G. (Ed.). Minimal Art – A Critical Anthology. E.P. Dutton & Co., Inc. New York, 1968.
- Bochner, M. Serial Art, Systems, Solipsism. in Battcock, G. (Ed.). Minimal Art – A Critical Anthology. E.P. Dutton & Co., Inc. New York, 1968.
- Breuil, H. (1981). "The Paleolithic Age," In: Larousse Encyclopedia of Prehistoric and Ancient Art, Edited by Huyghe, R, pp. 30–40. London: Hamlyn.
- Buckley, W. (1967) Sociology and Modern Systems Theory. Englewood Clifs, New Jersey: Prentice-Hall, INC.
- Chomsky, N. (1968). Language and Mind. New York: Harcourt Brace Jovanovich Inc.
- Davis, W. (1986a). The Origins of Image Making. Current Anthropology 27, No. 3. 193–215.
- Dumont, L. (1980). Homo hierarchicus – The Caste System and Its Implications. Chicago, The University of Chicago Press.
- Gombrich, E. H. (1962, 2ND ed). Art and Illusion. London: Phaidon Press.
- Koestler, A. (1967). The Ghost in the Machine. London: Pan Books LTD.
- Laszlo, E. Introduction to Systems Philosophy. Harper & Row, New York, 1972.
- Leakey, M. D. (1979). Footprints in the Ashes of Time. National Geographic, Vol.155, # 4, April 1979, pp. 446–57.
- Levi-Strauss, C. (1963 ). Structural anthropology. Norwich, Penguin books Ltd.
- Pattee, H. D.(Ed). (1973). Hierarchy theory. New York, George Braziller.
- Piaget, J. (1973). Structuralism. London, Routledge and Kegan Paul.
- Simon, H. A. (1998).The Sciences of the Artificial. Cambridge, Massachusetts, The MIT press.
- Stamps, J. S. (1980). Holonomy: A Human System Theory. Seaside, California. Intersystems Publications.
- Weiss, P. (1971). Hierarchically Organized Systems in Theory and Practice. New York, Hafner Publishing Company.
- Whyte, L. L. Wilson, A. G. and Wilson, D. (Eds.). (1969). Hierarchical Structures, New York, American Elsevier Publishing Company, Inc.
