= Avital Boruchovsky =

Israeli chess grandmaster (born 1997)

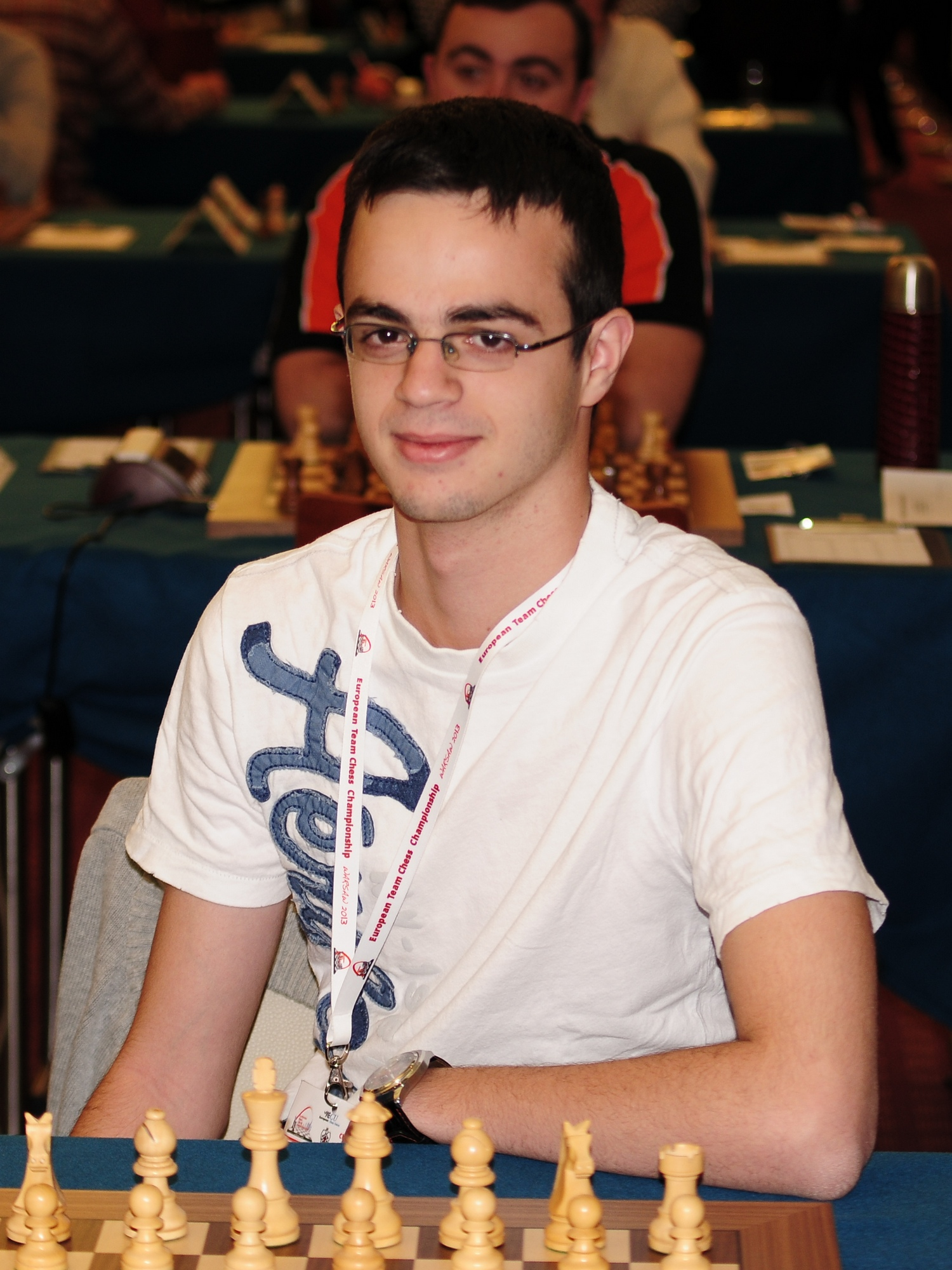
- Boruchovsky at the European Team Chess Championship in Warsaw 2013

Personal information
- Native name: אביטל בורוכובסקי
- Born: March 15, 1997 (age 29)

Chess career
- Country: Israel
- Title: Grandmaster (2014)
- FIDE rating: 2523 (July 2026)
- Peak rating: 2565 (September 2017)
Medal record
European Individual Chess Championship

Avital Boruchovsky (Hebrew: אביטל בורוכובסקי; born March 15, 1997) is an Israeli chess grandmaster.

He was awarded the International Master title in 2012. In 2014, FIDE additionally awarded him the Grandmaster title, subject to achieving a 2500 Elo rating. His conditional qualification for the GM title resulted from the two norms that were gained at the 13th European Individual Championships (Bulgaria, 2014) and the 29th European Club Cup (Greece, 2013), where he scored 6.5/11 and 5/7 respectively. Boruchovsky's highest rating was 2565 (in September, 2017).

In 2016 Avital Boruchovsky's team won the 2016 Israeli Cup. Other players in the team were Tamir Nabaty and Alon Mindlin
