= Dew =

Droplets of water that form in the morning or evening

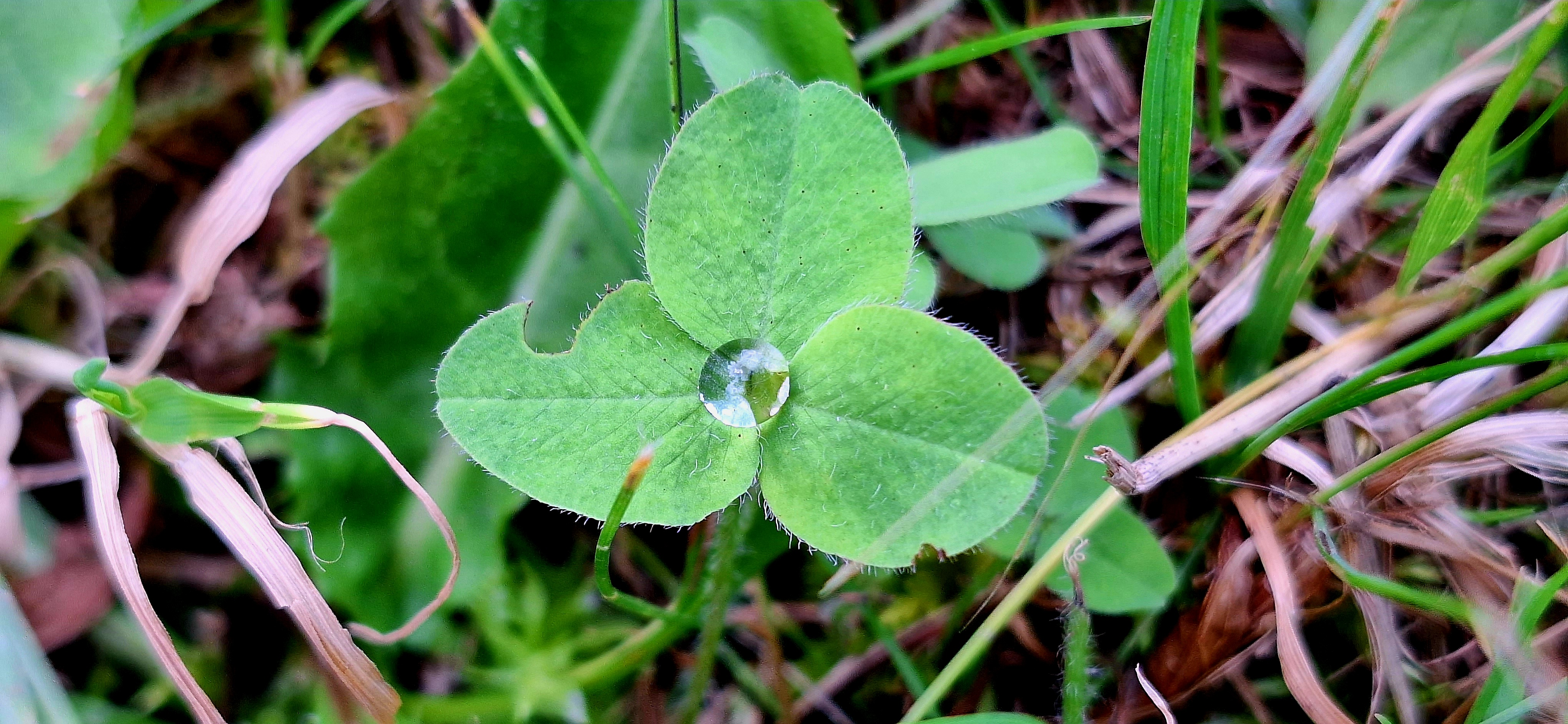
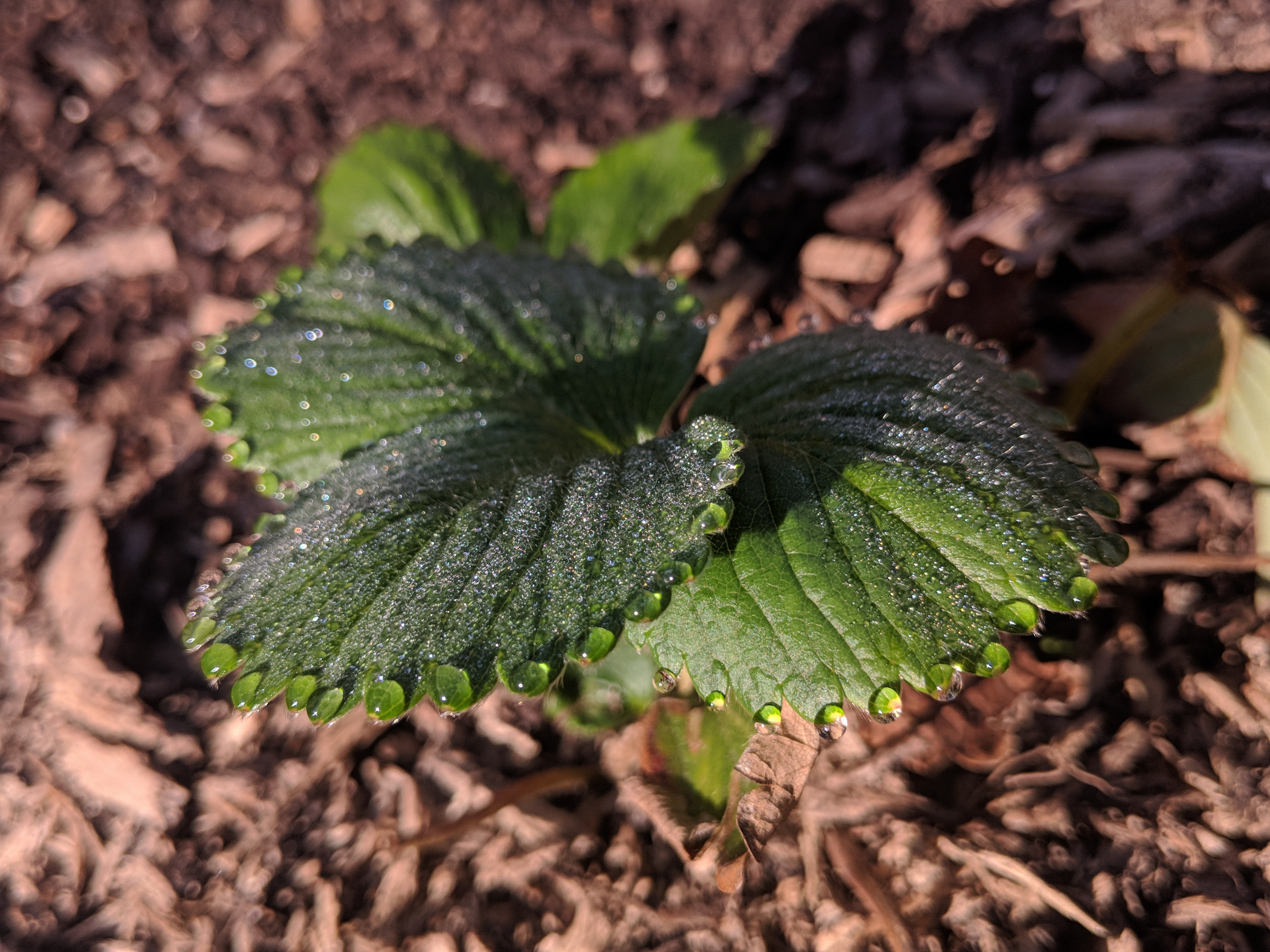
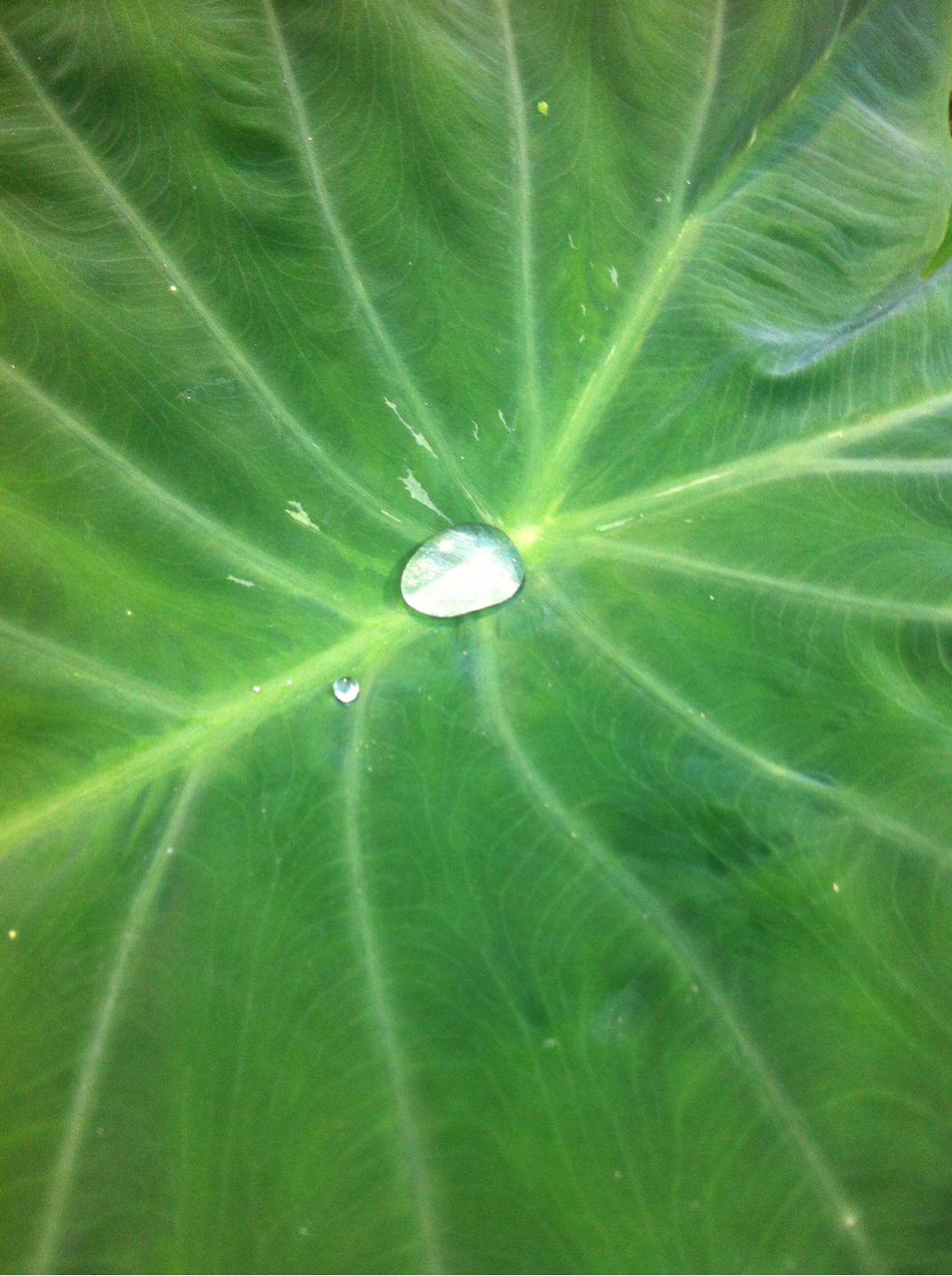
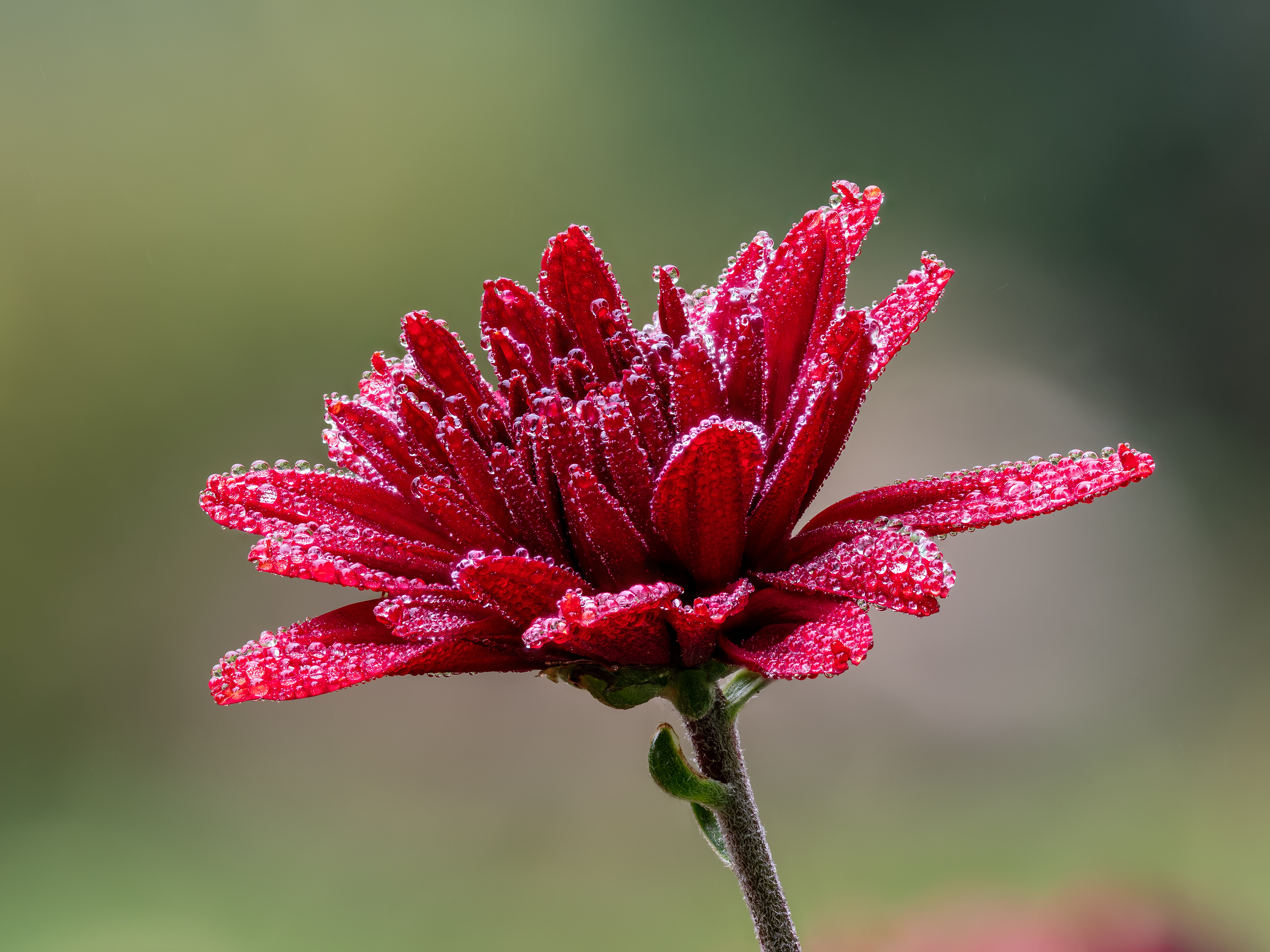
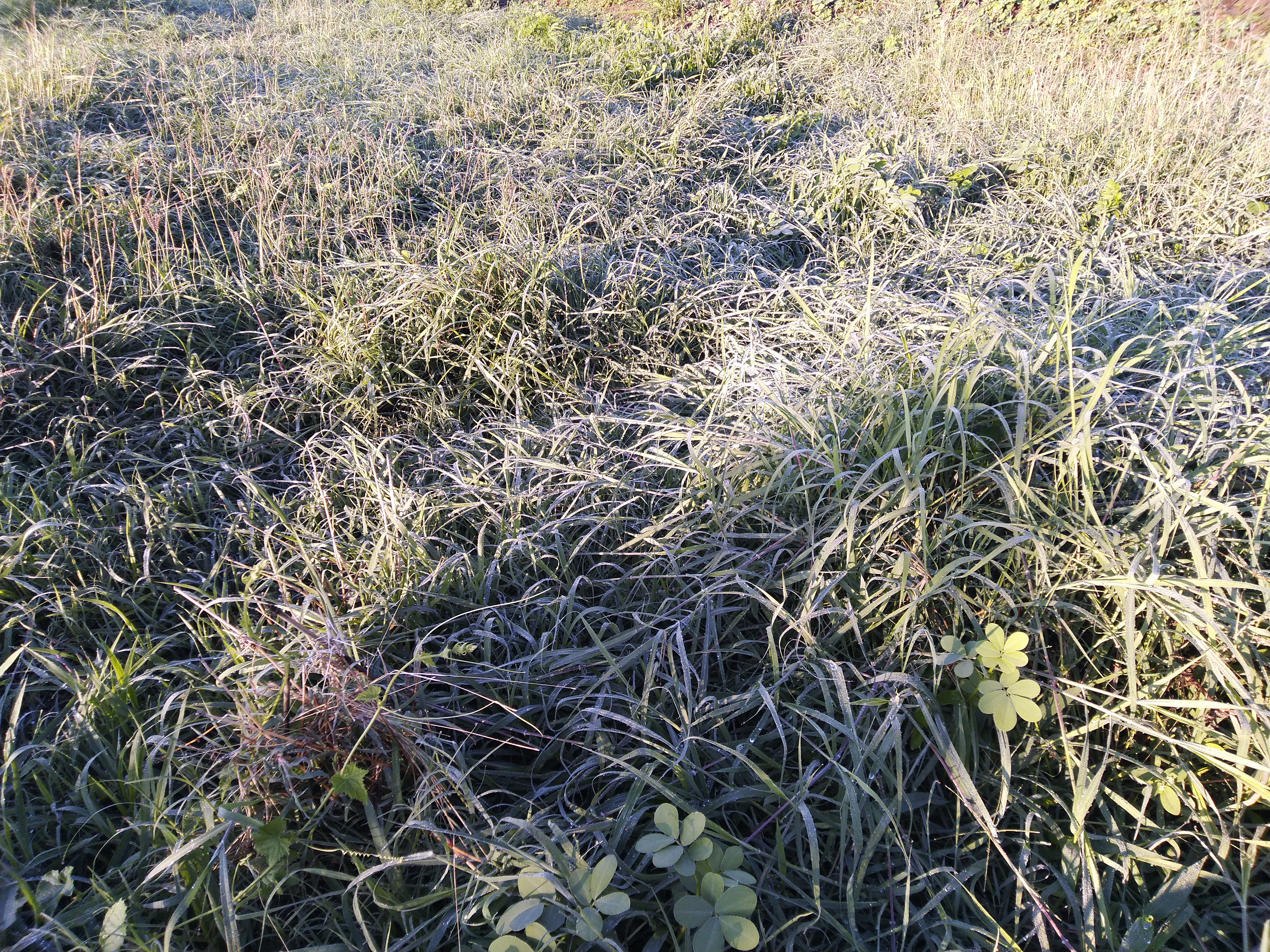
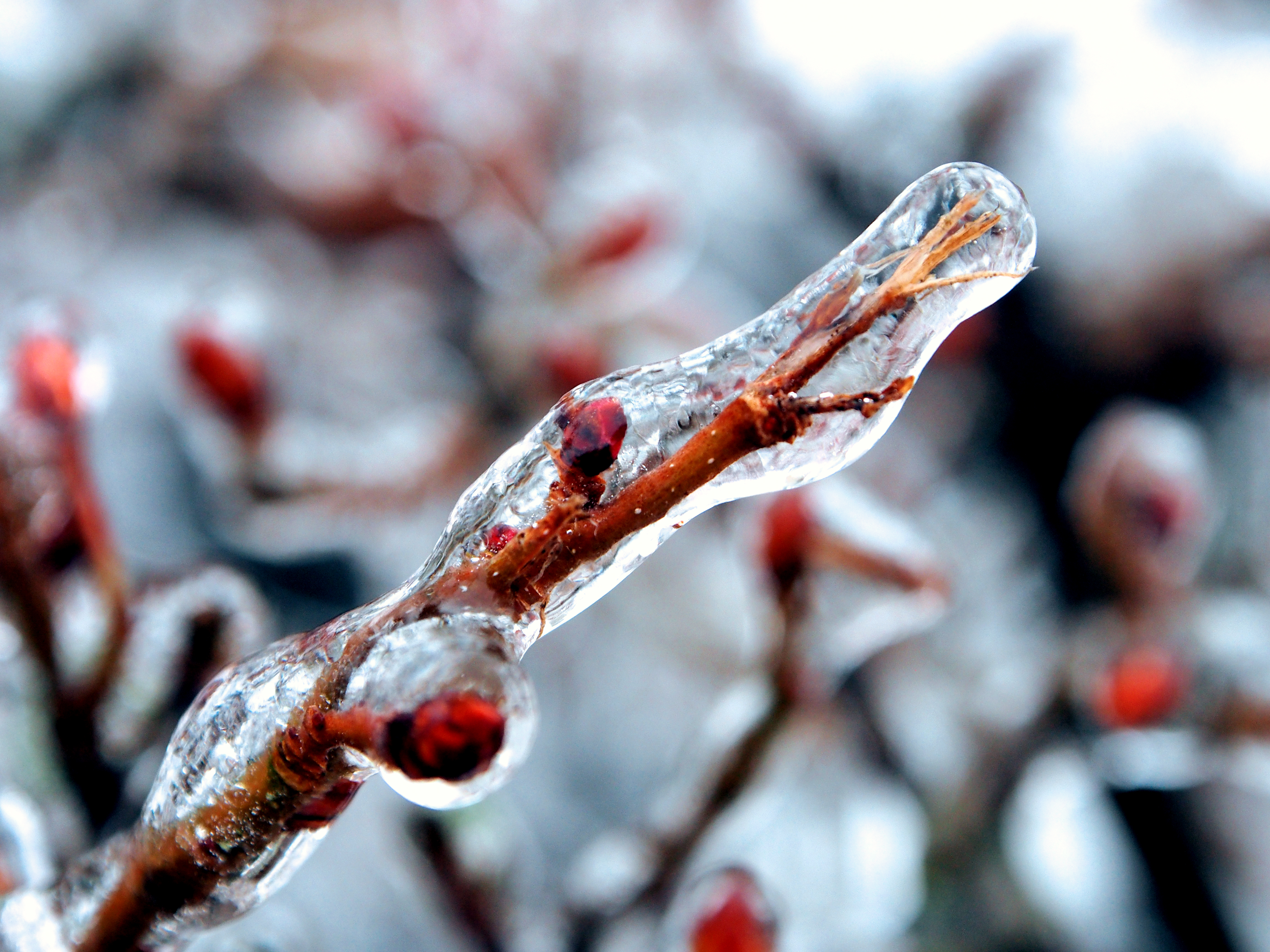
Clockwise from upper left: a drop of dew in the middle of a clover; dew formed on the surface of strawberry leaves; dew drops on a flower; under cold temperatures, dew may freeze and form a layer of ice over plants and objects; dense dew on grass; a drop of dew on a Colocasia leaf at the Garden Society of Gothenburg.

Dew is water in the form of droplets that appears on thin, exposed objects in the morning or evening due to condensation. As the exposed surface cools by radiating its heat, atmospheric moisture condenses at a rate greater than that at which it can evaporate, resulting in the formation of water droplets.

When temperatures are low enough, dew takes the form of ice, called frost.

Because dew is related to the temperature of surfaces, in late summer it forms most easily on surfaces that are not warmed by conducted heat from deep ground, such as grass, leaves, railings, car roofs, and bridges.

== Formation ==
Water vapor will condense into droplets depending on the temperature. The temperature at which droplets form is called the dew point. When surface temperature drops, eventually reaching the dew point, atmospheric water vapor condenses to form droplets on the surface. This process is distinct from those hydrometeors (meteorological occurrences of water) which form directly in air that has cooled to its dew point (typically around condensation nuclei), such as fog and clouds. The thermodynamic principles of formation, however, are the same. Dew is commonly formed at night, evening, and morning.

== Occurrence ==
Adequate cooling of a surface typically takes place when it loses more energy by infrared radiation than it receives as solar radiation from the Sun. This is especially the case on clear nights. Poor thermal conductivity restricts the replacement of such losses from deeper ground layers, which are typically warmer at night. Preferred objects of dew formation are thus poor-conducting or well-isolated from the ground and are non-metallic, while shiny-metal-coated surfaces are poor infrared radiators. Preferred weather conditions include the absence of clouds and little water vapor in the higher atmosphere to minimize greenhouse effects, and sufficient humidity of the air near the ground. A calm rather than windy night will produce dew, because wind transports (nocturnally) warmer air from higher reaches to cold surfaces. However, if the atmosphere is the major source of moisture (this type is called dewfall), a certain amount of ventilation is needed to replace the vapor that is already condensed. The highest optimum wind speeds could be found on arid islands. Wind always seems adverse, however, if the wet soil beneath is the major source of vapor (in which case dew is said to form by distillation).

Dew formation is also at work when, for example, eyeglasses become steamy in a warm, wet room or during certain industrial processes. In these cases, though, the more accurate term is condensation.

== Measurement ==
A classical device for dew measurement is the drosometer. A small (artificial) condenser surface is suspended from an arm attached to a pointer or pen that records the condenser's weight changes onto a drum. Besides being very wind sensitive, however, this, like all artificial-surface devices, measures only meteorological the potential for dew formation. An actual quantity of dew depends on surface properties, so measuring it might involve placing plants, leaves, or whole soil columns on a balance with their surfaces at the same height and in the same surroundings as would occur naturally. This effects a small lysimeter. Other methods might involve estimating: by, for example, comparing droplets to standardized photographs; or by a volumetric measurement of water wiped from the surface; by guttation; or by measuring dewfall and/or distillation.

== Significance ==
Due to its dependence on radiation balance, dew amounts can reach a theoretical maximum of about 0.8 mm per night; measured values, however, rarely exceed 0.5 mm. In most climates, an dew annual average is considered too small to compare with the effects of rainfall. In regions with considerable dry seasons, adapted plants like lichen or pine seedlings benefit from dew. Large-scale, natural irrigation without rainfall, such as in the Atacama and Namib deserts, however, is mostly attributed to fog water. In the Negev Desert in Israel, dew has been found to account for almost half of the water found in three dominant desert species: Salsola inermis, Artemisia sieberi and Haloxylon scoparium.

Another effect of dew is its hydration of fungal substrates and the mycelia of species such as pleated inkcaps, often found on lawns, and Phytophthora infestans, which causes blight on potato plants.

=== Historic ===
In the book On the Universe (De Mundo), which was composed before 250 BC or between 350 and 200 BC, dew was described as "moisture minute in composition falling from a clear sky;" ice was described as "water congealed in a condensed form from a clear sky;" hoar-frost was described as "congealed dew," and "dew-frost" was defined as "dew which is half congealed".

In Greek mythology, Ersa is the goddess and personification of dew. In the Ersa myth, morning dew was created when Eos (Ersa's aunt), goddess of the dawn, cried for her son's death (although he later achieved immortality).

Dew, known in Hebrew as טל (tal), is significant in the Jewish religion for its agricultural and theological purposes. On the first day of Passover, the Chazan, dressed in a white kittel, leads a service in which he prays for dew between that moment and Sukkot. During the rainy season, between December and Passover, additions in the Amidah describe blessed dew coming together with rain. Various midrashim refer to dew as a tool for ultimate resurrection. "Dewy" or "my father is the morning dew" are approximate etymologies of the Hebrew given name, Avital.

In the Biblical Torah or Old Testament, dew is used symbolically in Deuteronomy 32:2: "My doctrine shall drop as the rain, my speech shall distill as the dew, as the small rain upon the tender herb, and as the showers upon the grass."

In the Catholic Mass of the Western Rite, whenever the Second Eucharistic Prayer is said, the priest prays over bread and wine, to God the Father; "Make holy, therefore, these gifts, we pray, by sending down your Spirit upon them like the dewfall, so that they may become for us the Body and Blood of our Lord Jesus Christ." The idea that the Holy Spirit enters the world and our lives in a quiet, undramatic way, "like the dewfall", has great appeal for many Christians.

== Artificial harvesting ==
The harvesting of dew potentially allows water availability in areas where supporting weather conditions, such as rain, are lacking. Several man-made devices such as antique big stone piles in Ukraine, medieval dew ponds in Southern England, and volcanic stone covers on the fields of Lanzarote have been thought to be dew-catching devices, but could be shown to work on other principles. At present, the International Organization for Dew Utilization (OPUR) is working on effective, foil-based condensers for regions where rain or fog cannot cover water needs throughout the year.

Large-scale dew harvesting systems have been made by the Indian Institute of Management Ahmedabad (IIMA) with the participation of OPUR in the coastal, semiarid region of Kutch. These condensers can harvest more than 200 liters (on average) of dew water per night for about 90 nights in the October-to-May dew season. The IIMA research laboratory has shown that dew can serve as a supplementary source of water in coastal arid areas.

A large-scale dew harvesting scheme envisages circulating cold sea water in EPDM collectors near the seashore. These condense dew and fog to supply clean drinking water. Other, more recent, studies display possible roof integration for dew harvesting devices.
