= Tal Saki =

Tel-Saki
- Arabic: Tel Al-Saki; Hebrew: Tel Saki
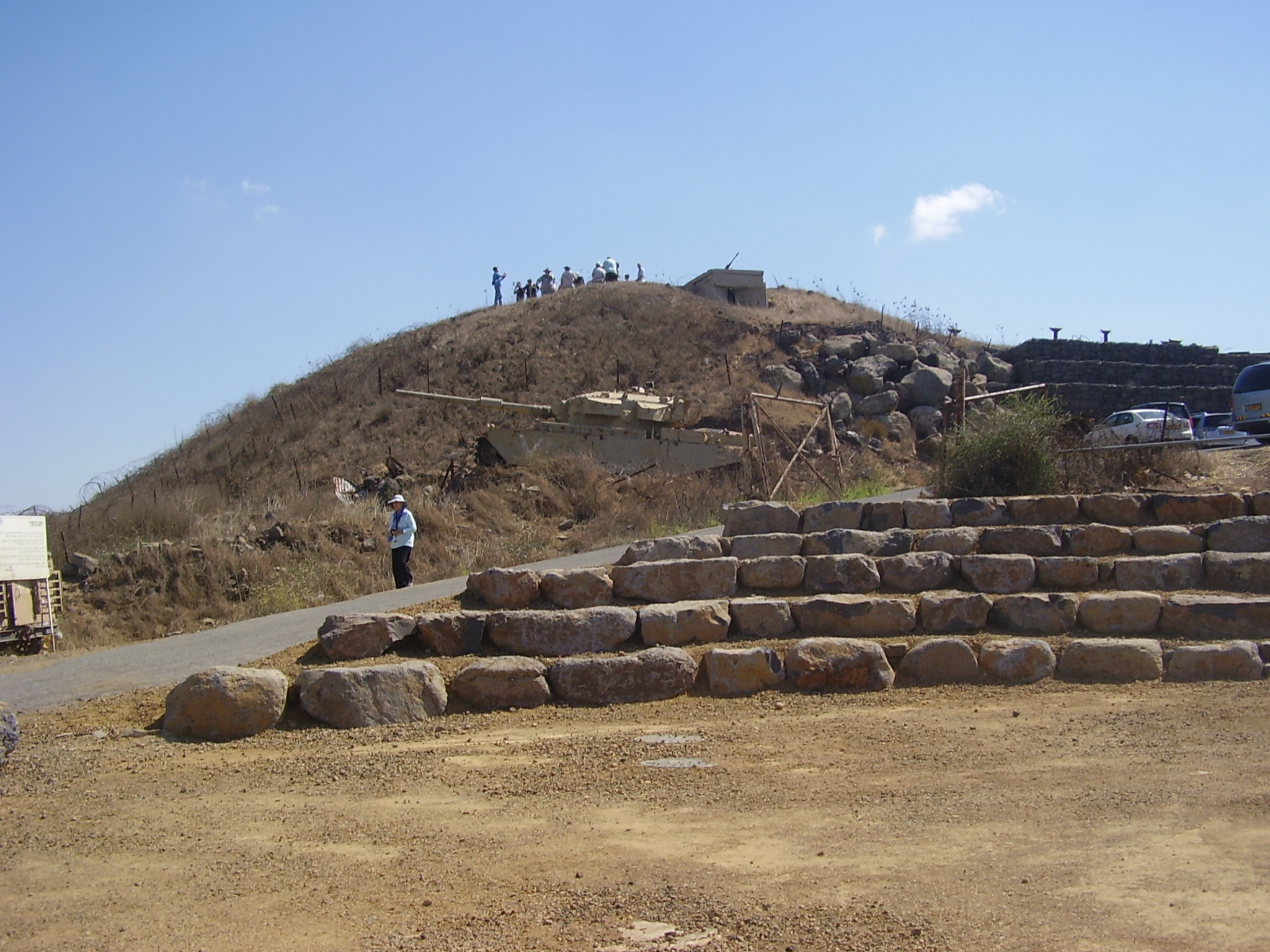
- TEL-Saki

Highest point
- Elevation: 594 m (1,949 ft)
- Coordinates: 32°51′59″N 35°49′50″E

Geography
- Location within the Golan Heights
- Location: Golan Heights

Geology
- Mountain type: Volcano

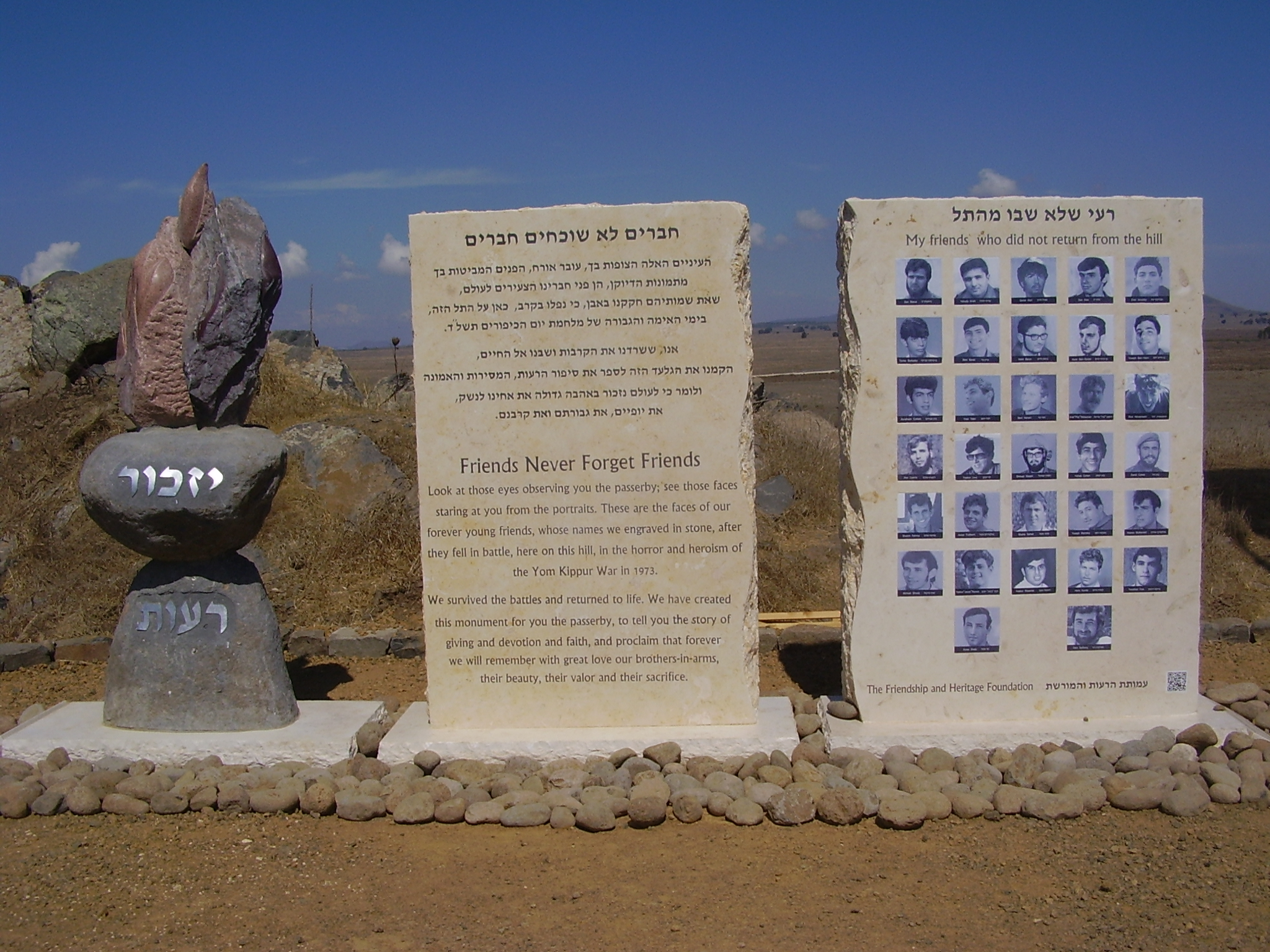
Tel Saki memorial

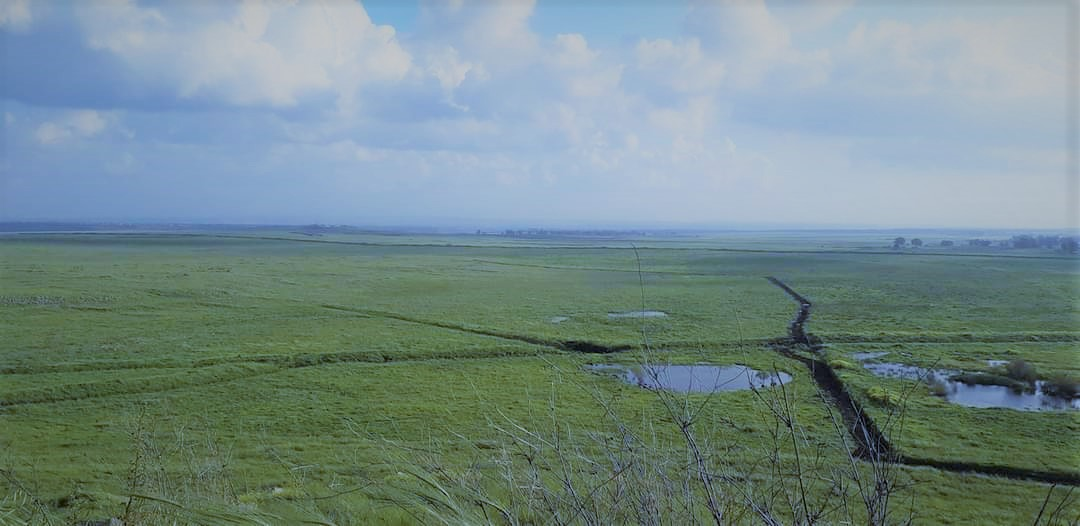
The view from Tel Saki

Tel Saki (Arabic: تل الساقي / ALA-LC: Tel Al-Saki; Hebrew: תל סאקי) is a dormant volcanic hill in the southeastern part of the Golan Heights. It reaches an elevation of 594 metres (1,949 ft) above sea level. The hill is a part of a chain of dormant volcanic mountains spanning along the eastern part of the Golan Heights.

Tel Saki was the site of conflict during the Yom Kippur War. A small group of Israeli soldiers were deployed to use the Syrian bunker at Tel Saki to direct artillery fire but were overwhelmed and surrounded by a large number of Syrian forces. The two sides exchanged fire as more Israeli soldiers sought refuge in the bunker. After more than a day of fighting, Syrian soldiers left the hill, and Israeli fighters rescued those hiding in the bunker.
