= Dialysis =

Dialysis may refer to:

- Dialysis (chemistry), a process of separating molecules in solution
  - Electrodialysis, used to transport salt ions from one solution to another through an ion-exchange membrane under the influence of an applied electric potential.
- Kidney dialysis is the process of removing water, solutes and toxins from the blood of individuals with compromised kidney function, primary types of which are:
  - Hemodialysis
  - Peritoneal dialysis
  - Hemofiltration
- Liver dialysis, a detoxification treatment for liver failure.
- Dialysis (fly), a genus of insects in the family Xylophagidae
