= Xylophagus junki =

Scientific classification
- Kingdom: Animalia
- Phylum: Arthropoda
- Clade: Pancrustacea
- Class: Insecta
- Order: Diptera
- Family: Xylophagidae
- Genus: Xylophagus
- Species: X. junki

Binomial name
- Xylophagus junki (Szilády, 1932)

Synonyms
- Erinna junki Szilády, 1932

Species of awl fly

Xylophagus junki is a species of awl fly belonging to the family Xylophagidae. It is similar to Xylophagus ater but in junki the metapleural lobes bare are bare and the thorax in the female entirely shining.

== Distribution ==
Europe, Russia.
