= Dialysis fasciventris =

Scientific classification
- Kingdom: Animalia
- Phylum: Arthropoda
- Class: Insecta
- Order: Diptera
- Family: Xylophagidae
- Genus: Dialysis
- Species: D. fasciventris

Binomial name
- Dialysis fasciventris (Loew, 1874)

Synonyms
- Triptotricha fasciventris Loew, 1874; Dialysis fasciiventris Bergroth, 1889

Species of fly

Dialysis fasciventris is a species of fly in the family Xylophagidae.

== Distribution ==
United States.
