= Dialysis dispar =

Scientific classification
- Kingdom: Animalia
- Phylum: Arthropoda
- Class: Insecta
- Order: Diptera
- Family: Xylophagidae
- Genus: Dialysis
- Species: D. dispar

Binomial name
- Dialysis dispar Bigot, 1879

Synonyms
- Dialysis disparilis Bergroth, 1889

Species of fly

Dialysis dispar is a species of fly in the family Xylophagidae.

== Distribution ==
Canada, United States.
