= Xylophagus cinctus =

Scientific classification
- Kingdom: Animalia
- Phylum: Arthropoda
- Clade: Pancrustacea
- Class: Insecta
- Order: Diptera
- Family: Xylophagidae
- Genus: Xylophagus
- Species: X. cinctus

Binomial name
- Xylophagus cinctus (De Geer, 1776)

Synonyms
- Empis subulata Panzer, 1797; Nemotelus cinctus De Geer, 1776; Rhagio syrphoides Panzer, 1800; Xylophagus abdominalis Loew, 1870; Xylophagus fasciatus Walker, 1848; Xylophagus heros Harris, 1835

Species of fly

Xylophagus cinctus is a species of fly in the family Xylophagidae.

== Description ==
Venation simple.The discal cell is placed rather far out on the wing, with smaller posterior cells, as in Tipulidae. Clouding on forks and crossveins. It differs from Xylophagus ater in the following respects. The first antenna! segment is short ;not more than twice as long as second segment;the metapleural lobes are hairy The thorax in both sexes is entirely dulled by greyish dusting, which is rather more rather more prominent in certain longitudinal stripes.Females have a red abdomen. Males are all-black. Wing length 11.5mm ; body length up to 17mm.

== Distribution ==
Europe, Russia, China, Alaska to Quebec, south to California & Mississippi.
