= Merycomyia whitneyi =

Scientific classification
- Kingdom: Animalia
- Phylum: Arthropoda
- Class: Insecta
- Order: Diptera
- Family: Tabanidae
- Subfamily: Chrysopsinae
- Tribe: Bouvieromyiini
- Genus: Merycomyia
- Species: M. whitneyi

Binomial name
- Merycomyia whitneyi (Johnson, 1904)

Synonyms
- Merycomyia geminata Hine, 1912; Merycomyia mixta Hine, 1912; Tabanus whitneyi Johnson, 1904

Species of fly

Merycomyia whitneyi is a species of deer flies in the family Tabanidae. Larvae are known as sandworms and can be used as fish bait.

== Distribution ==
Canada, United States
