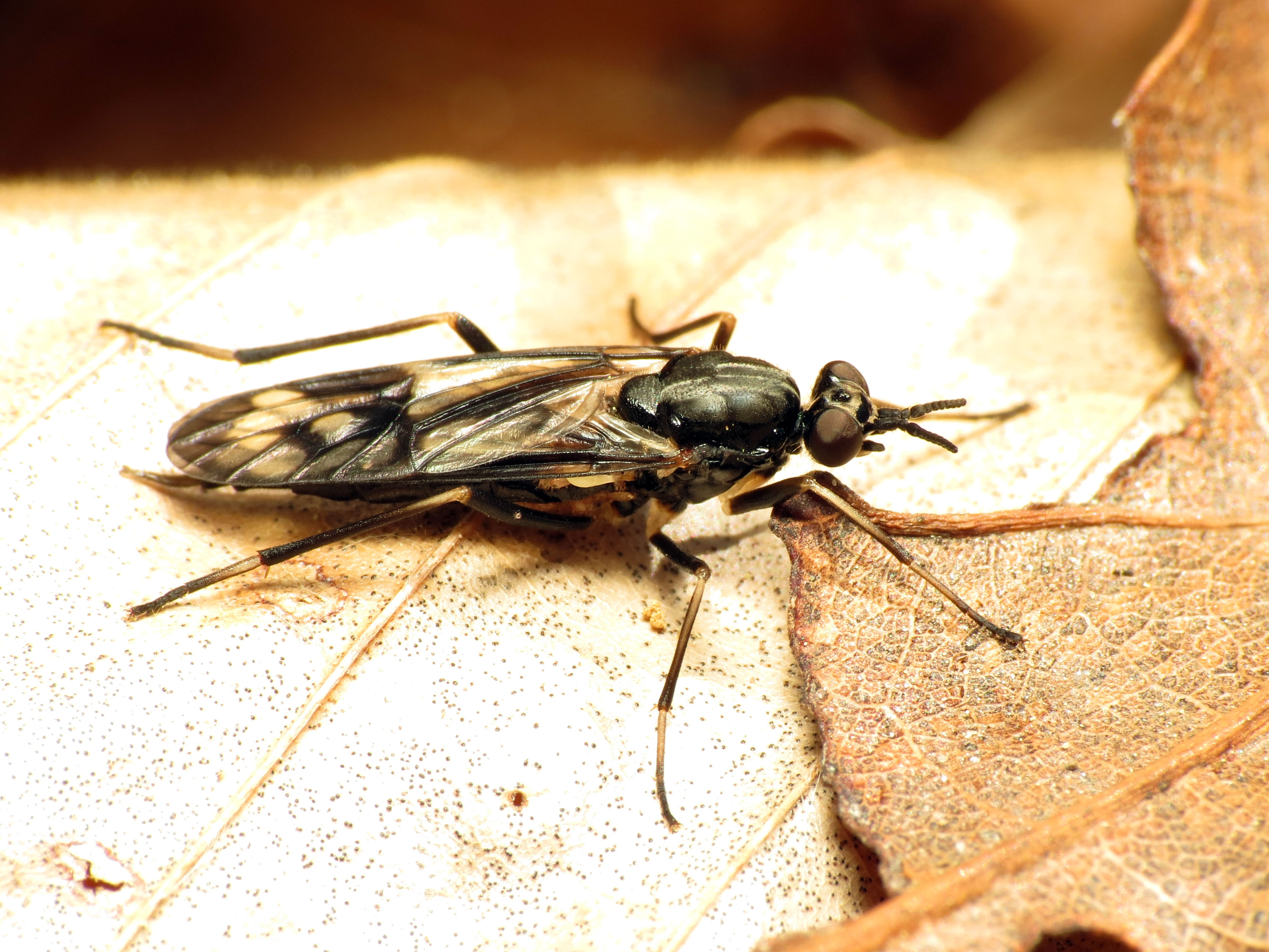

Scientific classification
- Kingdom: Animalia
- Phylum: Arthropoda
- Class: Insecta
- Order: Diptera
- Family: Xylophagidae
- Genus: Xylophagus
- Species: X. lugens

Binomial name
- Xylophagus lugens Loew, 1863Loew, 1863

Synonyms
- Xylophagus laceyi Curran, 1933; Xylophagus politus Harris, 1835

= Xylophagus lugens =

Species of fly

Xylophagus lugens is a species of fly in the family Xylophagidae.

== Distribution ==
Canada, United States.
