= Xylophagus gracilis =

Scientific classification
- Kingdom: Animalia
- Phylum: Arthropoda
- Class: Insecta
- Order: Diptera
- Family: Xylophagidae
- Genus: Xylophagus
- Species: X. gracilis

Binomial name
- Xylophagus gracilis Williston, 1885

Species of fly

Xylophagus gracilis is a species of fly in the family Xylophagidae.

== Distribution ==
Canada, United States.
