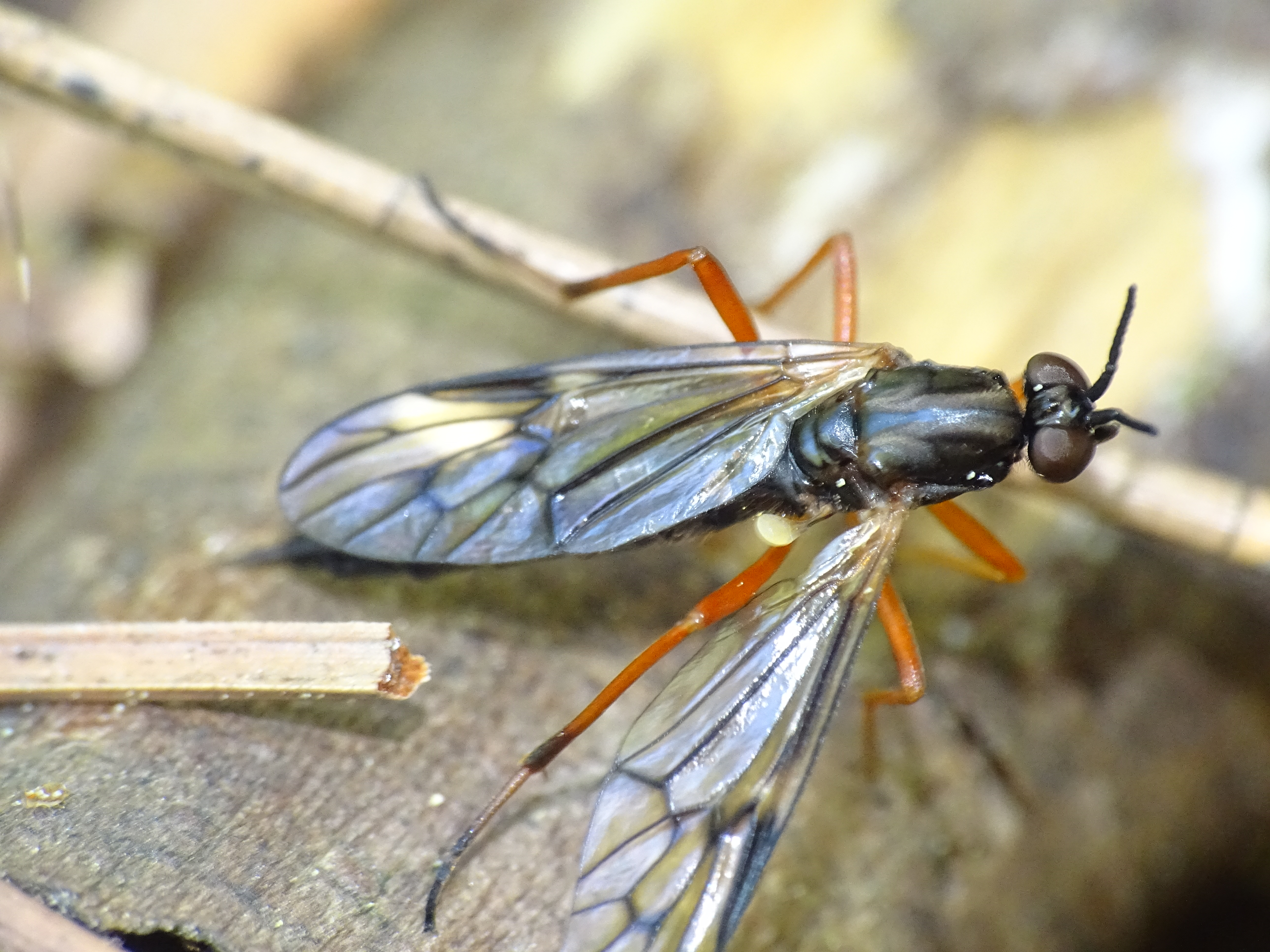

Scientific classification
- Kingdom: Animalia
- Phylum: Arthropoda
- Class: Insecta
- Order: Diptera
- Family: Xylophagidae
- Genus: Xylophagus
- Species: X. reflectens

Binomial name
- Xylophagus reflectens Walker, 1848

Synonyms
- Xylophagus fascipennis Harris, 1835; Xylophagus persequus Walker, 1850; Xylophagus longicornis Loew, 1869

= Xylophagus reflectens =

Species of fly

Xylophagus reflectens is a species of fly in the family Xylophagidae.

== Distribution ==
It is found in most of Canada (from Alberta to Nova Scotia), and the east of the United States.
