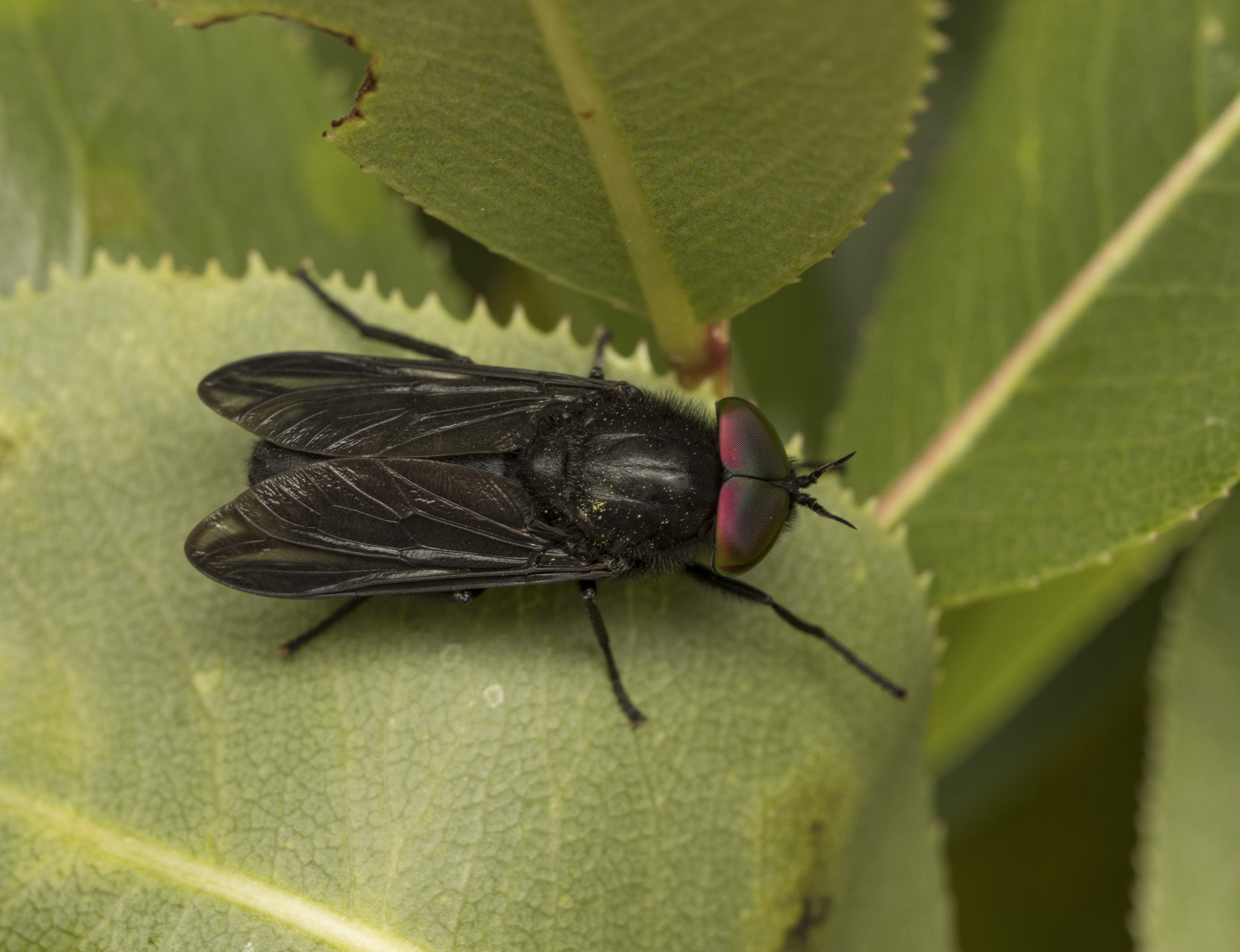

Scientific classification
- Kingdom: Animalia
- Phylum: Arthropoda
- Class: Insecta
- Order: Diptera
- Family: Tabanidae
- Subfamily: Chrysopsinae
- Tribe: Bouvieromyiini
- Genus: Pseudotabanus; Ricardo, 1915

Type species
- Pseudotabanus distinctus Ricardo, 1915

Synonyms
- Vepriella Mackerras, 1955

= Pseudotabanus =

Genus of insects

Pseudotabanus is a genus of horse flies in the family Tabanidae.

== Species ==
- Pseudotabanus carbo (Macquart, 1850)
- Pseudotabanus alcocki (Summers, 1912)
- Pseudotabanus ater (Taylor, 1917)
- Pseudotabanus burnsi (Mackerras, 1961)
- Pseudotabanus dereckii Trojan, 2002
- Pseudotabanus distinctus Ricardo, 1915
- Pseudotabanus equinus (Ferguson & Hill, 1922)
- Pseudotabanus eyreanus (Mackerras, 1961)
- Pseudotabanus fergusoni (Ricardo, 1917)
- Pseudotabanus frontalis (Ricardo, 1915)
- Pseudotabanus fulvissimus (Mackerras, 1961)
- Pseudotabanus fuscipennis (Ricardo, 1917)
- Pseudotabanus grandis (Ricardo, 1917)
- Pseudotabanus lunulatus (Bigot, 1892)
- Pseudotabanus nigripennis (Ricardo, 1917)
- Pseudotabanus obscurus (Mackerras, 1961)
- Pseudotabanus peregrinus (Mackerras, 1964)
- Pseudotabanus pullus (Mackerras, 1961)
- Pseudotabanus queenslandi Ricardo, 1915
- Pseudotabanus silvester (Bergroth, 1894)
- Pseudotabanus taylori (Mackerras, 1961)
- Pseudotabanus trypherus (Taylor, 1916)
