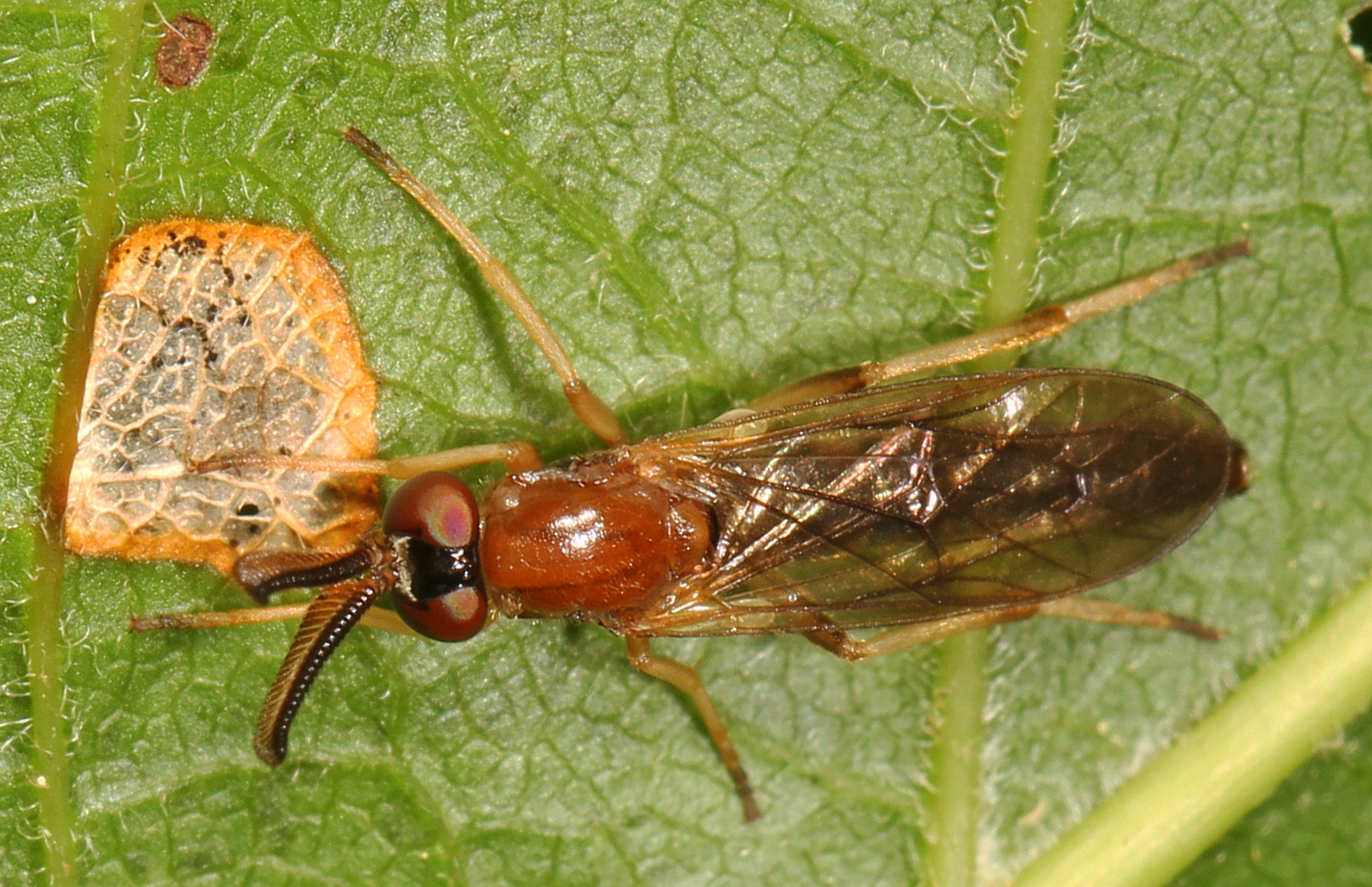

Scientific classification
- Kingdom: Animalia
- Phylum: Arthropoda
- Class: Insecta
- Order: Diptera
- Family: Xylophagidae
- Genus: Rachicerus
- Species: R. fulvicollis

Binomial name
- Rachicerus fulvicollis Walker, 1854

Synonyms
- Rachicerus fulvicollis Walker, 1848; Rachicerus ruficollis Osten Sacken, 1877

= Rachicerus fulvicollis =

Species of fly

Rachicerus fulvicollis is a species of fly in the family Xylophagidae.

== Distribution ==
United States.
