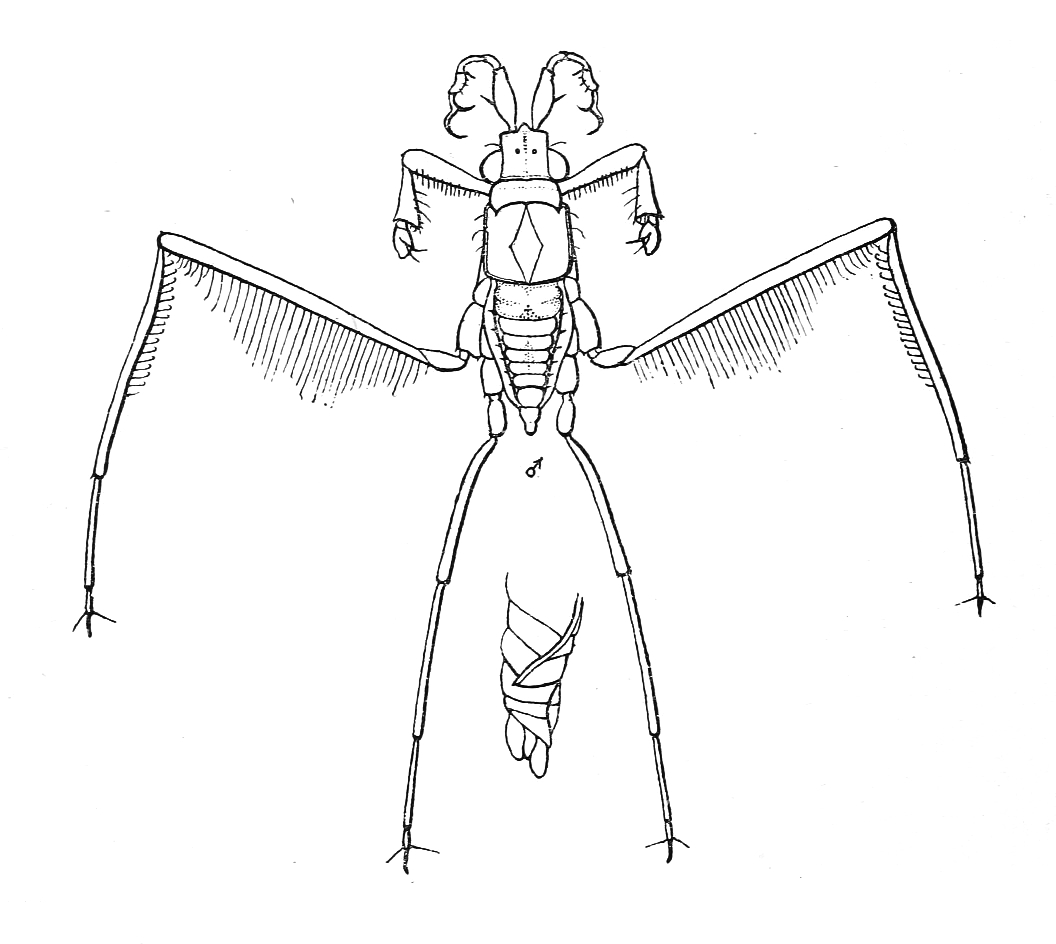
- male (inset shows side view of abdomen)

Scientific classification
- Domain: Eukaryota
- Kingdom: Animalia
- Phylum: Arthropoda
- Class: Insecta
- Order: Hemiptera
- Suborder: Heteroptera
- Family: Gerridae
- Genus: Rheumatobates
- Species: R. rileyi

Binomial name
- Rheumatobates rileyi Bergroth, 1892

= Rheumatobates rileyi =

Species of true bug

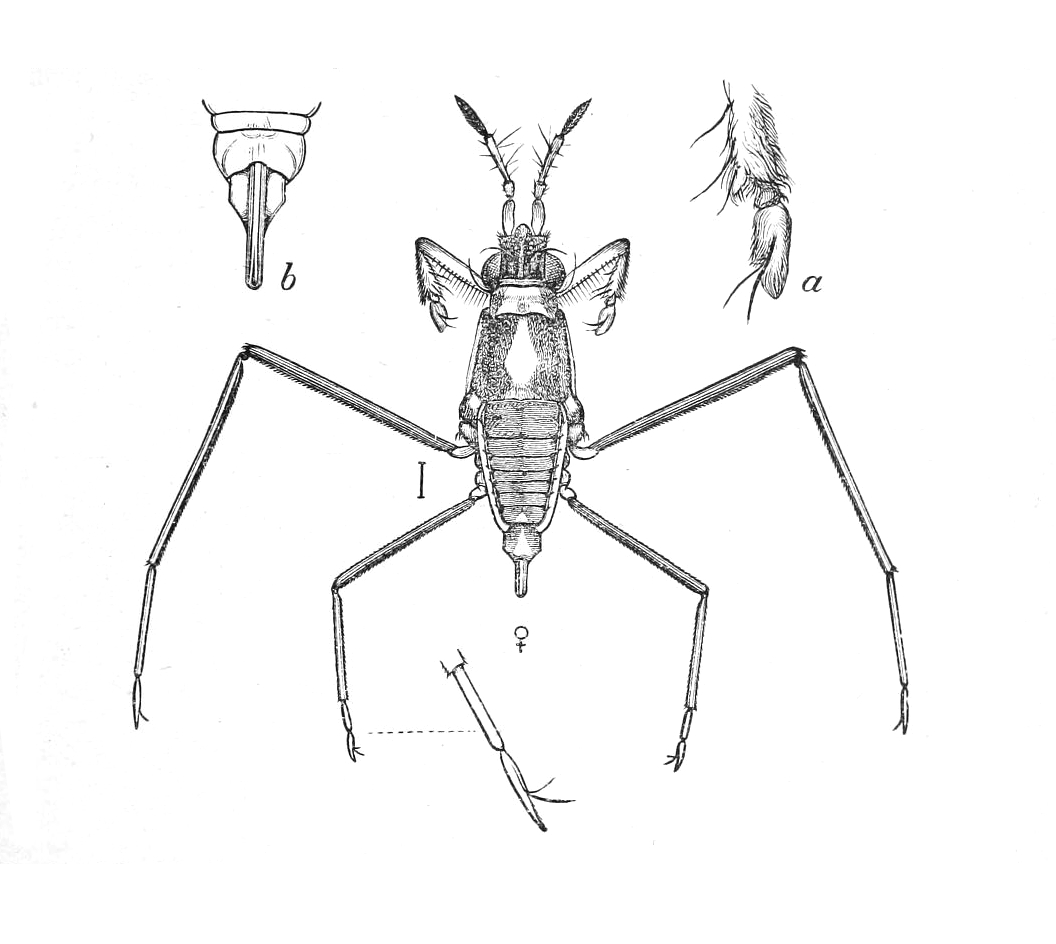
Female

Rheumatobates rileyi is a species of water strider in the family Gerridae. It is found in North America. The genus Rheumatobates is characterized by males having antennae with hook like structures. Males grab females around the head using the antennae and lift them off the water surface. The hind femur appears twisted and a dense cluster of hears are found on the hind femur and tibia in males.
