= Rachicerus honestus =

Scientific classification
- Kingdom: Animalia
- Phylum: Arthropoda
- Class: Insecta
- Order: Diptera
- Family: Xylophagidae
- Genus: Rachicerus
- Species: R. honestus

Binomial name
- Rachicerus honestus Osten Sacken, 1877

Species of fly

Rachicerus honestus is a species of fly in the family Xylophagidae.

== Distribution ==
United States.
