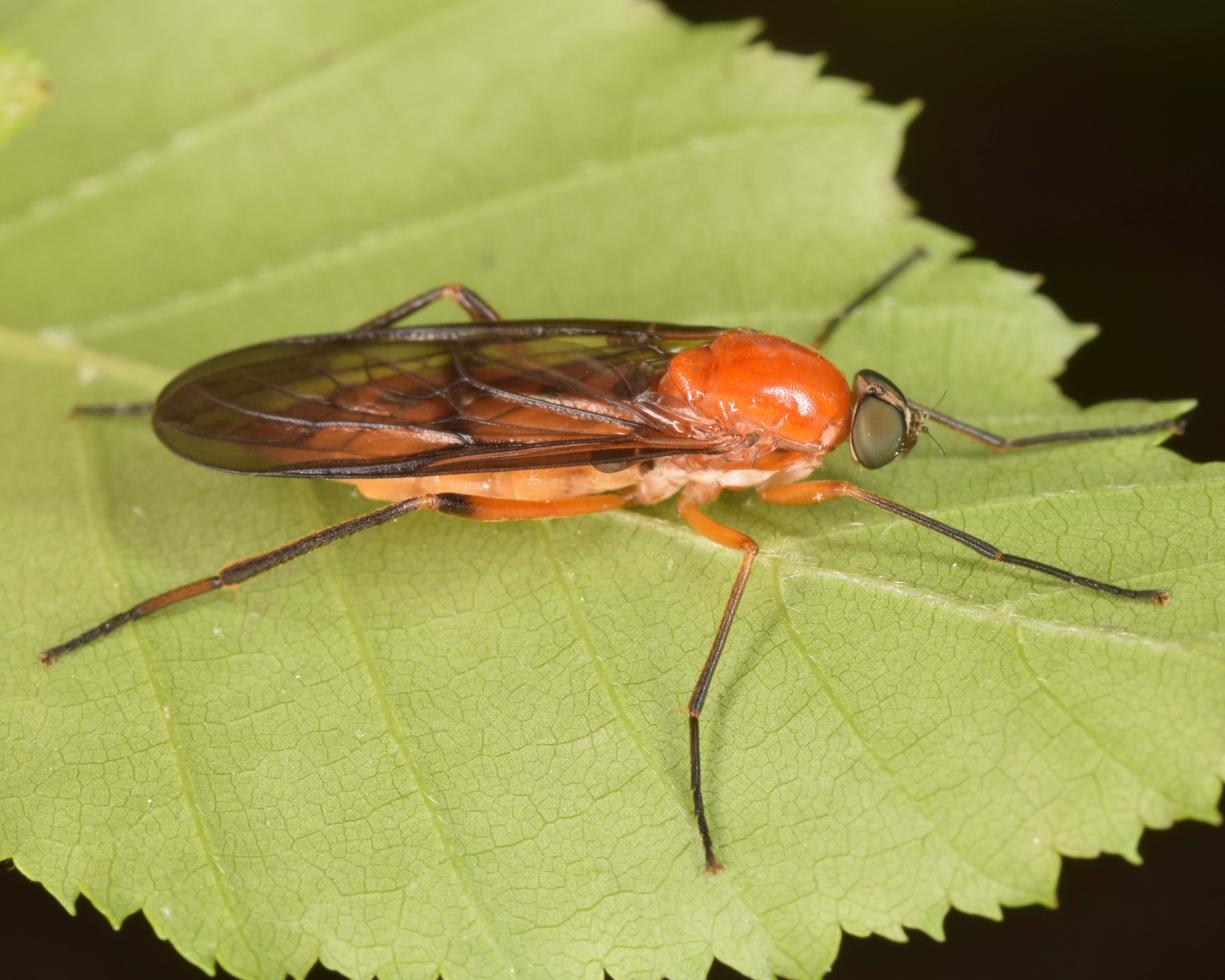

Scientific classification
- Kingdom: Animalia
- Phylum: Arthropoda
- Class: Insecta
- Order: Diptera
- Family: Xylophagidae
- Genus: Dialysis
- Species: D. rufithorax

Binomial name
- Dialysis rufithorax (Say, 1823)

Synonyms
- Leptis rufithorax Say, 1823

= Dialysis rufithorax =

Species of fly

Dialysis rufithorax is a species of fly in the family Xylophagidae.

== Distribution ==
United States.
