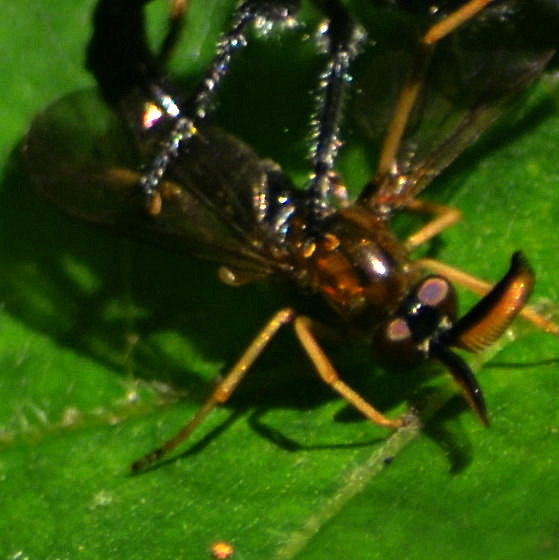
- Rachicerus obscuripennis

Scientific classification
- Domain: Eukaryota
- Kingdom: Animalia
- Phylum: Arthropoda
- Class: Insecta
- Order: Diptera
- Family: Xylophagidae
- Subfamily: Rachicerinae

Genera
- Rachicerus Walker, 1854

= Rachicerinae =

Subfamily of flies

The Rachicerinae are a small monogeneric subfamily of flies belonging to the family Xylophagidae.
