= Xylophagus decorus =

Scientific classification
- Kingdom: Animalia
- Phylum: Arthropoda
- Class: Insecta
- Order: Diptera
- Family: Xylophagidae
- Genus: Xylophagus
- Species: X. decorus

Binomial name
- Xylophagus decorus Williston, 1885

Synonyms
- Xylophagus politus Malloch, 1931

Species of fly

Xylophagus decorus is a species of fly in the family Xylophagidae.

== Distribution ==
Canada, United States.
