= Xylophagus nitidus =

Scientific classification
- Kingdom: Animalia
- Phylum: Arthropoda
- Class: Insecta
- Order: Diptera
- Family: Xylophagidae
- Genus: Xylophagus
- Species: X. nitidus

Binomial name
- Xylophagus nitidus Adams, 1904

Species of fly

Xylophagus nitidus is a species of fly in the family Xylophagidae.

== Distribution ==
Canada, United States.
