= Rachicerus nitidus =

Scientific classification
- Kingdom: Animalia
- Phylum: Arthropoda
- Class: Insecta
- Order: Diptera
- Family: Xylophagidae
- Genus: Rachicerus
- Species: R. nitidus

Binomial name
- Rachicerus nitidus Johnson, 1903

Synonyms
- Xylophagus nitidus Adams, 1904

Species of fly

Rachicerus nitidus is a species of fly in the family Xylophagidae.

== Distribution ==
Canada, United States.
