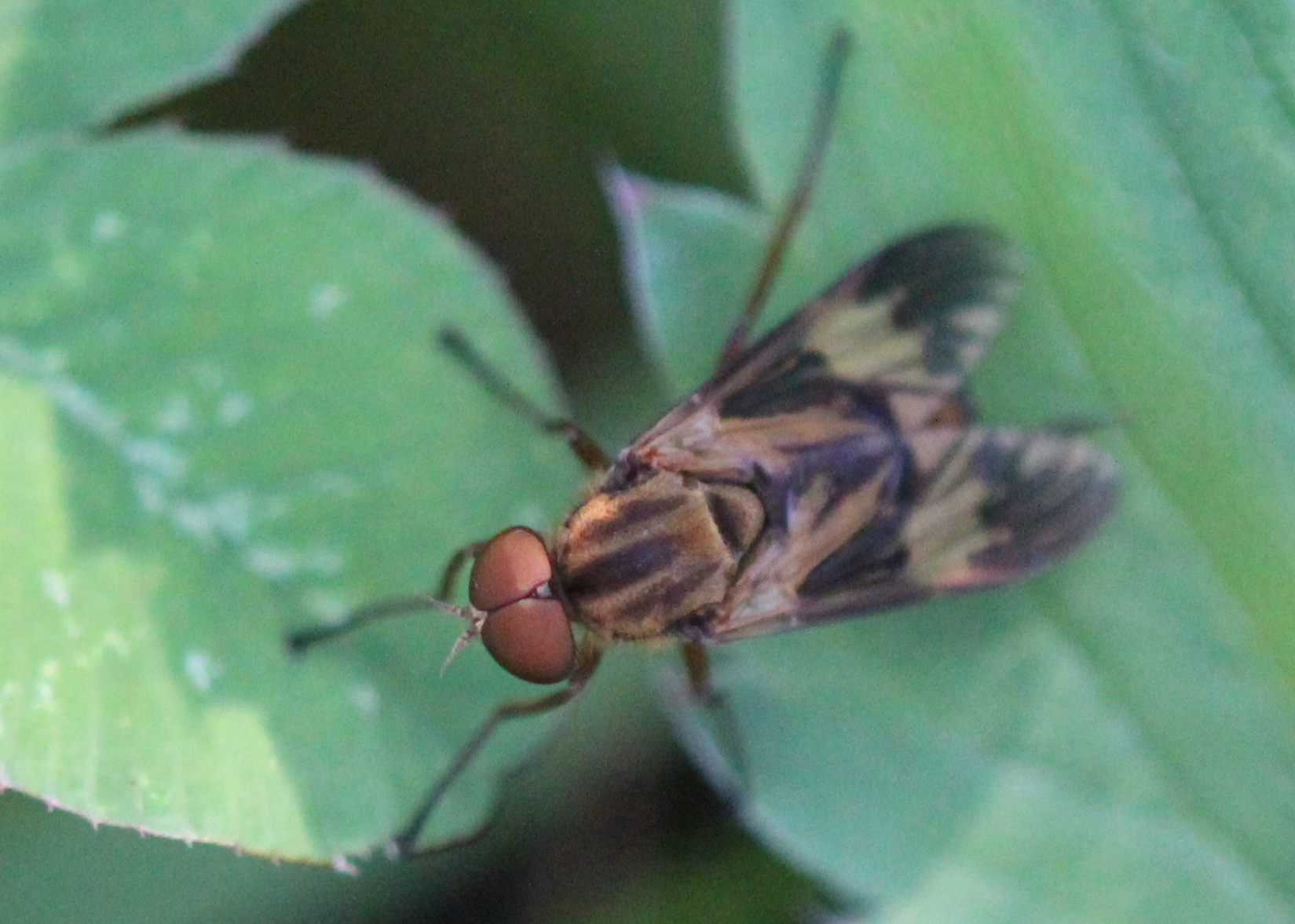

Scientific classification
- Kingdom: Animalia
- Phylum: Arthropoda
- Class: Insecta
- Order: Diptera
- Family: Xylophagidae
- Genus: Arthropeas
- Species: A. americana

Binomial name
- Arthropeas americana Loew, 1861

= Arthropeas americana =

Species of fly

Arthropeas americana is a species of fly in the family Xylophagidae.

== Distribution ==
Canada, United States.
