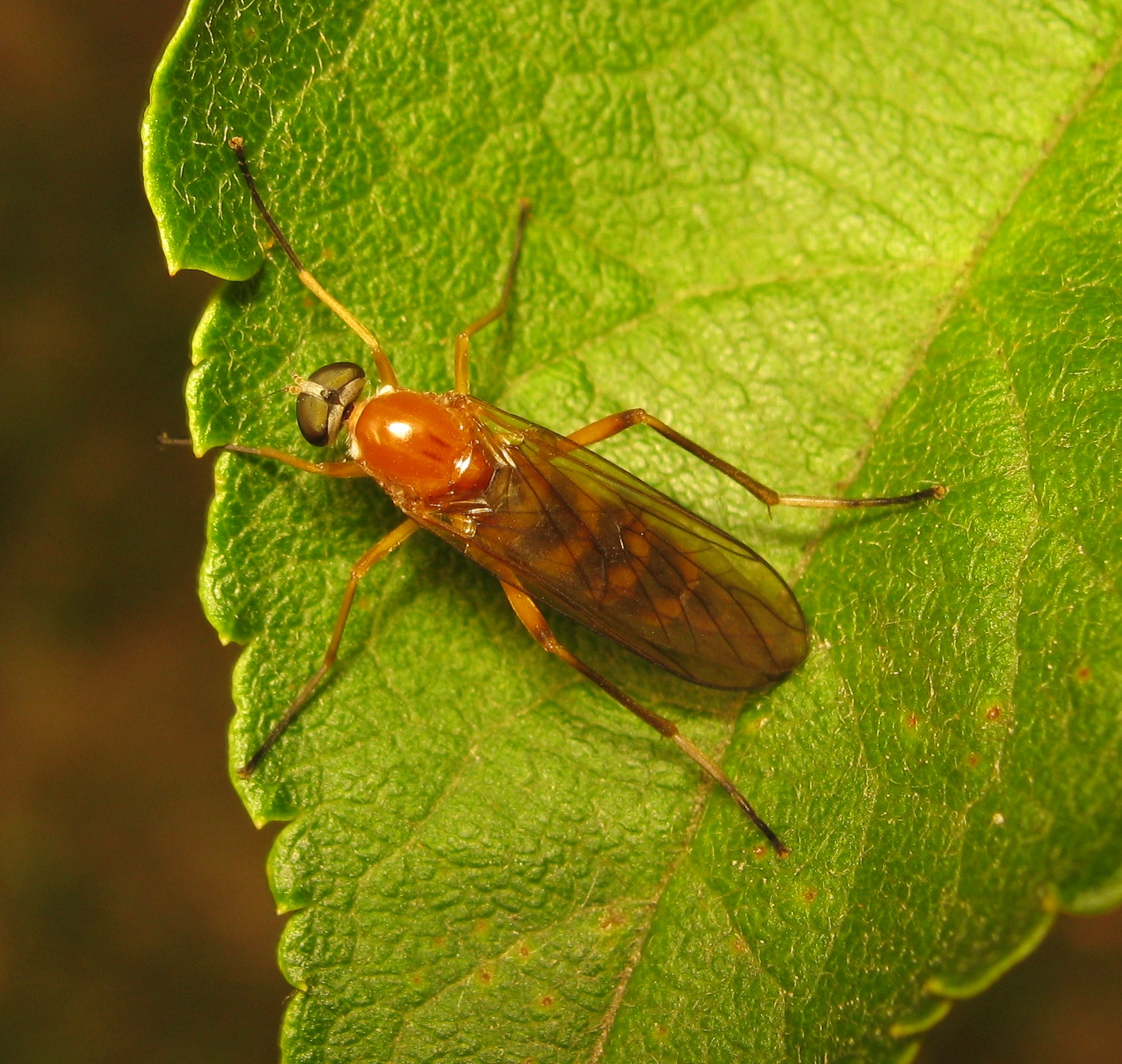
- Dialysis elongata

Scientific classification
- Kingdom: Animalia
- Phylum: Arthropoda
- Clade: Pancrustacea
- Class: Insecta
- Order: Diptera
- Family: Xylophagidae
- Genus: Dialysis; Walker in Saunders, 1850

Type species
- Dialysis dissimilis Walker in Saunders, 1850

Synonyms
- Agnotemyia Williston, 1886; Agnotomyia Williston, 1886; Diaysis Yang, 1997; Napemyia Webb, 1983; Triptotricha Loew, 1872

= Dialysis (fly) =

Genus of flies

Dialysis is a genus of flies in the family Xylophagidae.

== Species ==
- Dialysis aldrichi Williston, 1895
- Dialysis arakawae Matsumura, 1916
- Dialysis cispacifica Bezzi, 1912
- Dialysis dispar Bigot, 1879
- Dialysis elongata (Say, 1823)
- Dialysis fasciventris (Loew, 1874)
- Dialysis flava Yang & Yang, 1995
- Dialysis illinoensis (Webb, 1983)
- Dialysis iwatai Nagatomi, 1953
- Dialysis kesseli Hardy, 1948
- Dialysis lauta (Loew, 1872)
- Dialysis mentata Webb, 1978
- Dialysis meridionalis Yang & Yang, 1997
- Dialysis pallens Yang & Nagatomi, 1994
- Dialysis reparta Webb, 1978
- Dialysis revelata Cockerell, 1908
- Dialysis rufithorax (Say, 1823)
- Dialysis sinensis Yang & Nagatomi, 1994
