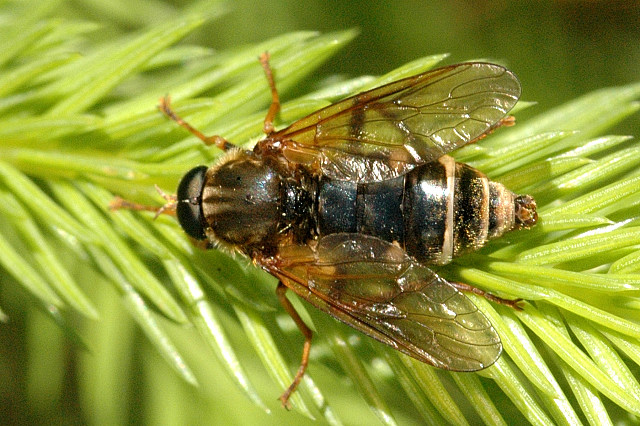
- Coenomyia ferruginea

Scientific classification
- Kingdom: Animalia
- Phylum: Arthropoda
- Class: Insecta
- Order: Diptera
- Family: Xylophagidae
- Genus: Coenomyia; Latreille, 1797

Type species
- Musca ferruginea Scopoli, 1763

Synonyms
- Sicus Fabricius, 1798; Conomyia Matsumura, 1916; Cynomyja Fabricius, 1805; Caenomyia Latreille, 1809; Caenomyia Scudder, 1882; Cenomyia Bigot, 1879; Coenomya Latreille, 1802

= Coenomyia =

Genus of flies

Coenomyia is a genus of flies in the family Xylophagidae.

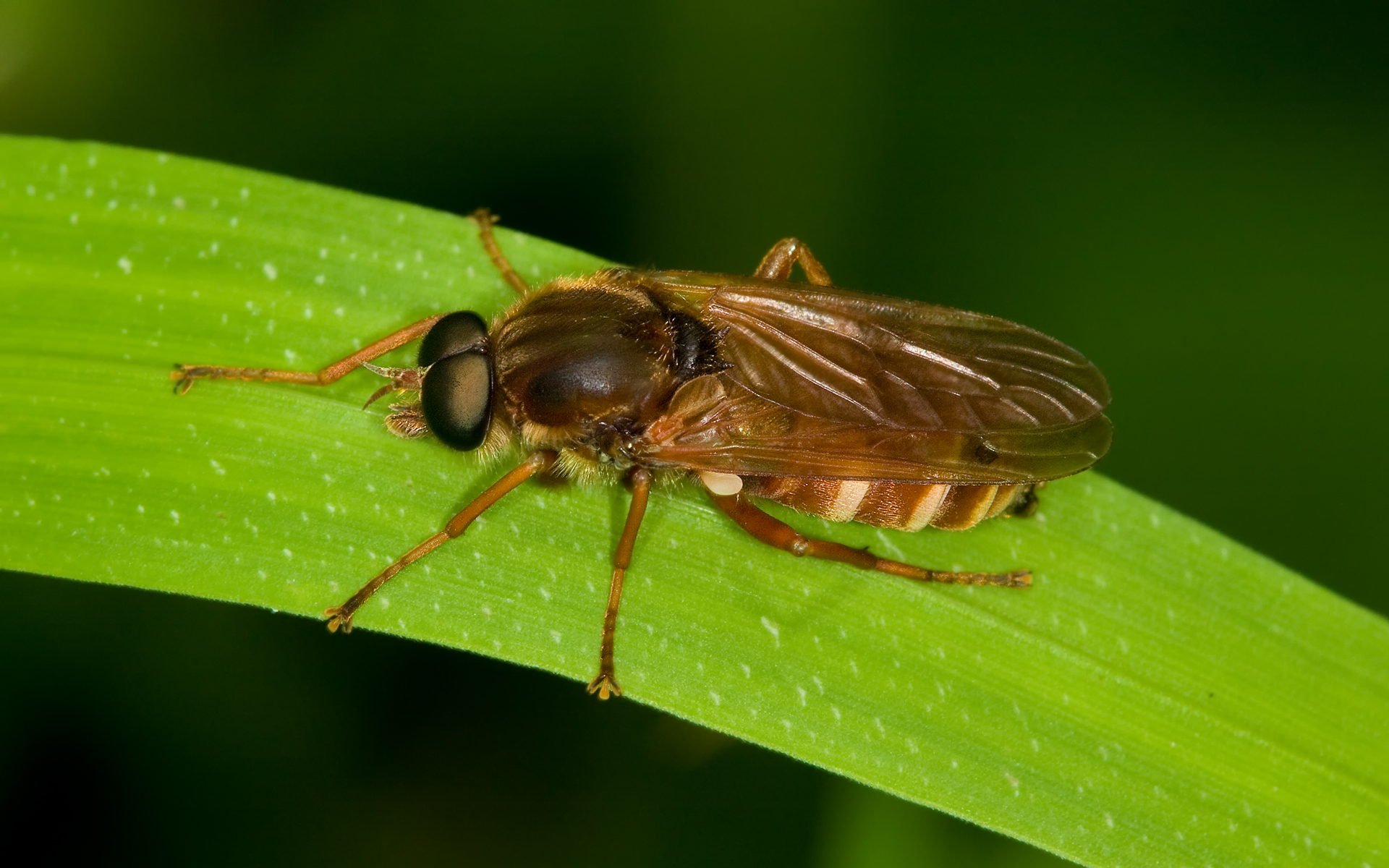
Coenomyia ferruginea

== Species ==
- Coenomyia basalis Matsumura, 1915
- Coenomyia bituberculata Enderlein, 1921
- Coenomyia ferruginea (Scopoli, 1763)
- Coenomyia maculata Yang & Nagatomi, 1994
