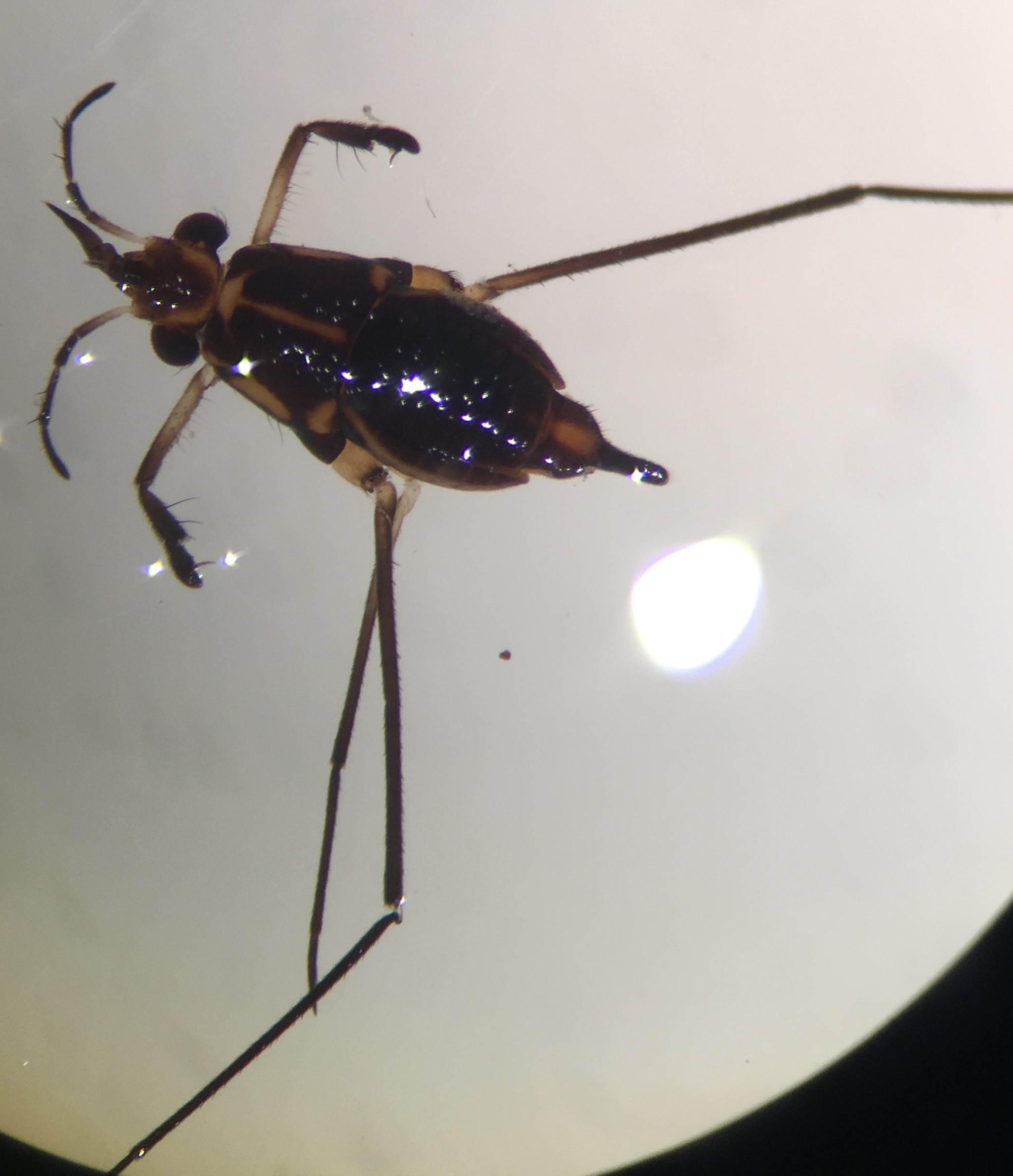

Scientific classification
- Domain: Eukaryota
- Kingdom: Animalia
- Phylum: Arthropoda
- Class: Insecta
- Order: Hemiptera
- Suborder: Heteroptera
- Family: Gerridae
- Genus: Rheumatobates
- Species: R. vegatus

Binomial name
- Rheumatobates vegatus Drake & Harris, 1942

= Rheumatobates vegatus =

Species of true bug

Rheumatobates vegatus is a species of water strider in the family Gerridae. It is found in the Caribbean Sea, Central America, and North America.
