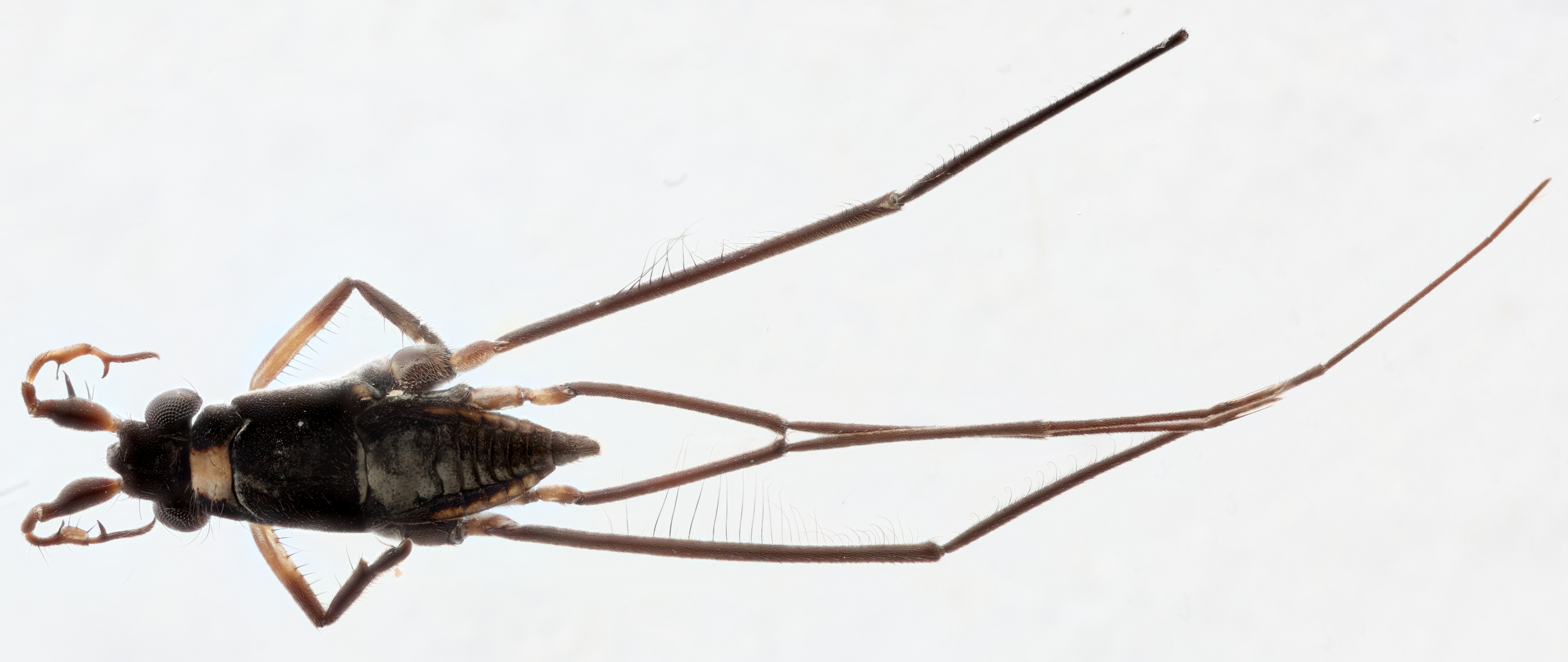
- Rheumatobates tenuipes

Scientific classification
- Kingdom: Animalia
- Phylum: Arthropoda
- Clade: Pancrustacea
- Class: Insecta
- Order: Hemiptera
- Suborder: Heteroptera
- Family: Gerridae
- Genus: Rheumatobates; Bergroth, 1892

= Rheumatobates =

Genus of true bugs

Rheumatobates is a genus of water striders in the family Gerridae. There are more than 30 described species in Rheumatobates.

== Species ==
These 39 species belong to the genus Rheumatobates:

- Rheumatobates aestuarius Polhemus, 1969
- Rheumatobates bergrothi Meinert, 1895
- Rheumatobates bonariensis (Berg, 1898)
- Rheumatobates carvalhoi Drake & Harris, 1944-01
- Rheumatobates citatus Drake & Hottes, 1951
- Rheumatobates clanis Drake & Harris, 1932
- Rheumatobates crassifemur Esaki, 1926
- Rheumatobates creaseri Hungerford, 1936
- Rheumatobates crinitus Herring, 1949-01
- Rheumatobates curracis Drake & Carvalho, 1954
- Rheumatobates drakei Hungerford, 1954
- Rheumatobates hamatus Drake & Chapman, 1954
- Rheumatobates hungerfordi Wiley, 1923
- Rheumatobates imitator (Uhler, 1894)
- Rheumatobates klagei Schroeder, 1931
- Rheumatobates longisetosus J.Polhemus & Manzano, 1992-01
- Rheumatobates mangrovensis (China, 1943)
- Rheumatobates meinerti Schroeder, 1931
- Rheumatobates mexicanus Drake & Hottes, 1951
- Rheumatobates minimus Drake, 1958-01
- Rheumatobates minutus Hungerford, 1936
- Rheumatobates ornatus J.Polhemus & Cheng, 1977
- Rheumatobates palosi Blatchley, 1926
- Rheumatobates pecularis Polhemus & Spangler
- Rheumatobates peculiaris J.Polhemus & Spangler, 1989-27
- Rheumatobates petilus Drake & Hottes, 1951
- Rheumatobates plumipes Castro-Vargas & Morales-Castaño, 2011-23
- Rheumatobates praeposterus Bergroth, 1908
- Rheumatobates probolicornis J.Polhemus & Manzano, 1992-01
- Rheumatobates prostatus J.Polhemus, 1975
- Rheumatobates rileyi Bergroth, 1892
- Rheumatobates spinosus Hungerford, 1954
- Rheumatobates tenuipes Meinert, 1895
- Rheumatobates trinitatis (China, 1943)
- Rheumatobates trinitatus (China, 1943)
- Rheumatobates trulliger Bergroth, 1915
- Rheumatobates urabaensis Molano, Mondragón & Morales, 2017-16
- Rheumatobates vegatus Drake & Harris, 1942
- Rheumatobates wrighti Drake & Harris
