= Eucompsa =

Scientific classification
- Kingdom: Animalia
- Phylum: Arthropoda
- Clade: Pancrustacea
- Class: Insecta
- Order: Diptera
- Family: Tabanidae
- Subfamily: Chrysopsinae
- Tribe: Bouvieromyiini
- Genus: Eucompsa; Enderlein, 1922

Type species
- Eucompsa ocellata Enderlein, 1922

Genus of insects

Eucompsa is a genus of horse flies in the family Tabanidae.

== Species ==
- Eucompsa aureocincta Enderlein, 1922
- Eucompsa tecticallosa Schuurmans Stekhoven, 1932
