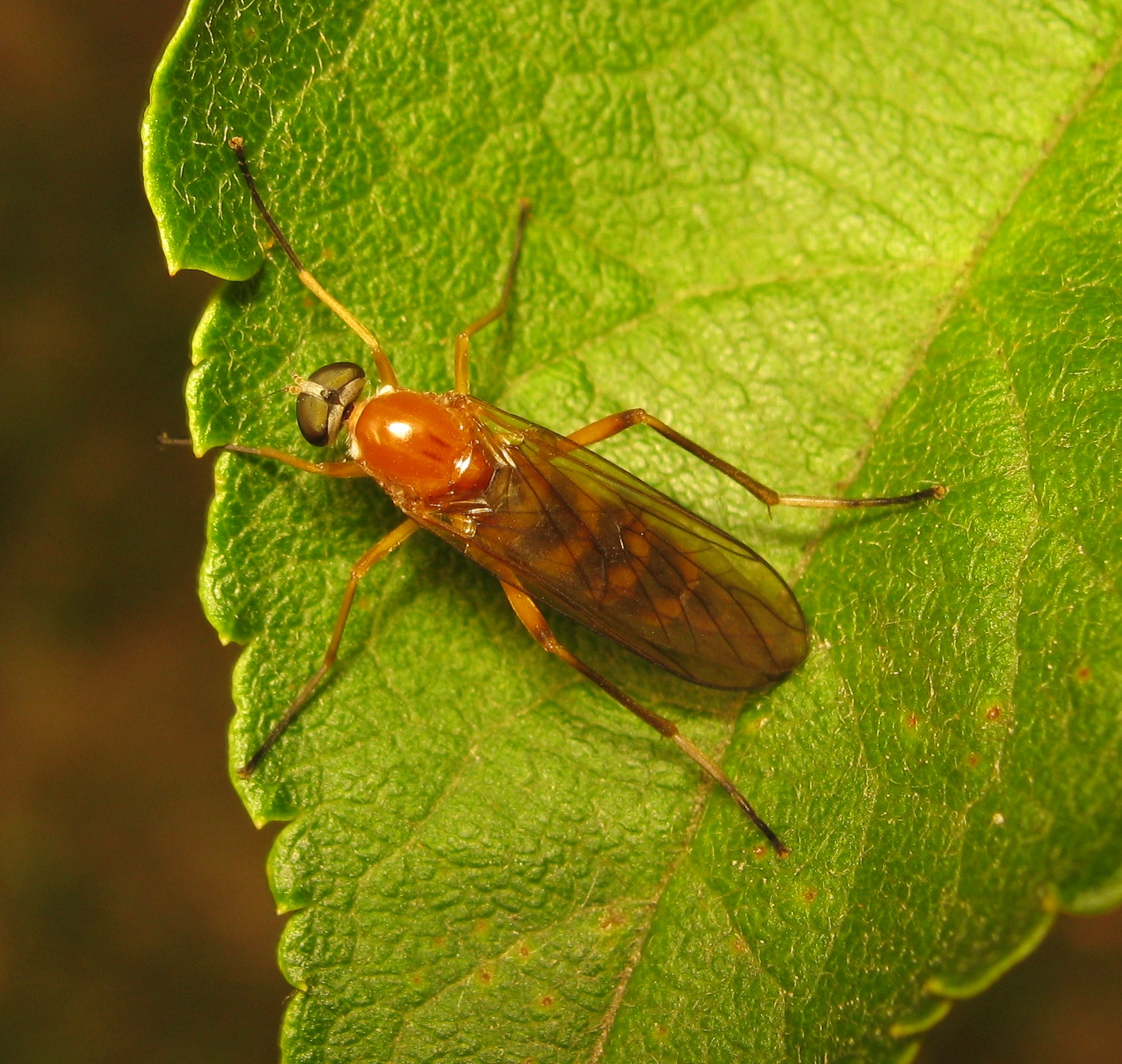

Scientific classification
- Kingdom: Animalia
- Phylum: Arthropoda
- Class: Insecta
- Order: Diptera
- Family: Xylophagidae
- Genus: Dialysis
- Species: D. elongata

Binomial name
- Dialysis elongata (Say, 1823)

Synonyms
- Stygia elongata Say, 1823; Leptis humeralis Harris, 1835; Dialysis dissimilis Walker, 1850

= Dialysis elongata =

Species of fly

Dialysis elongata is a species of fly in the family Xylophagidae.

== Distribution ==
Canada, United States.
