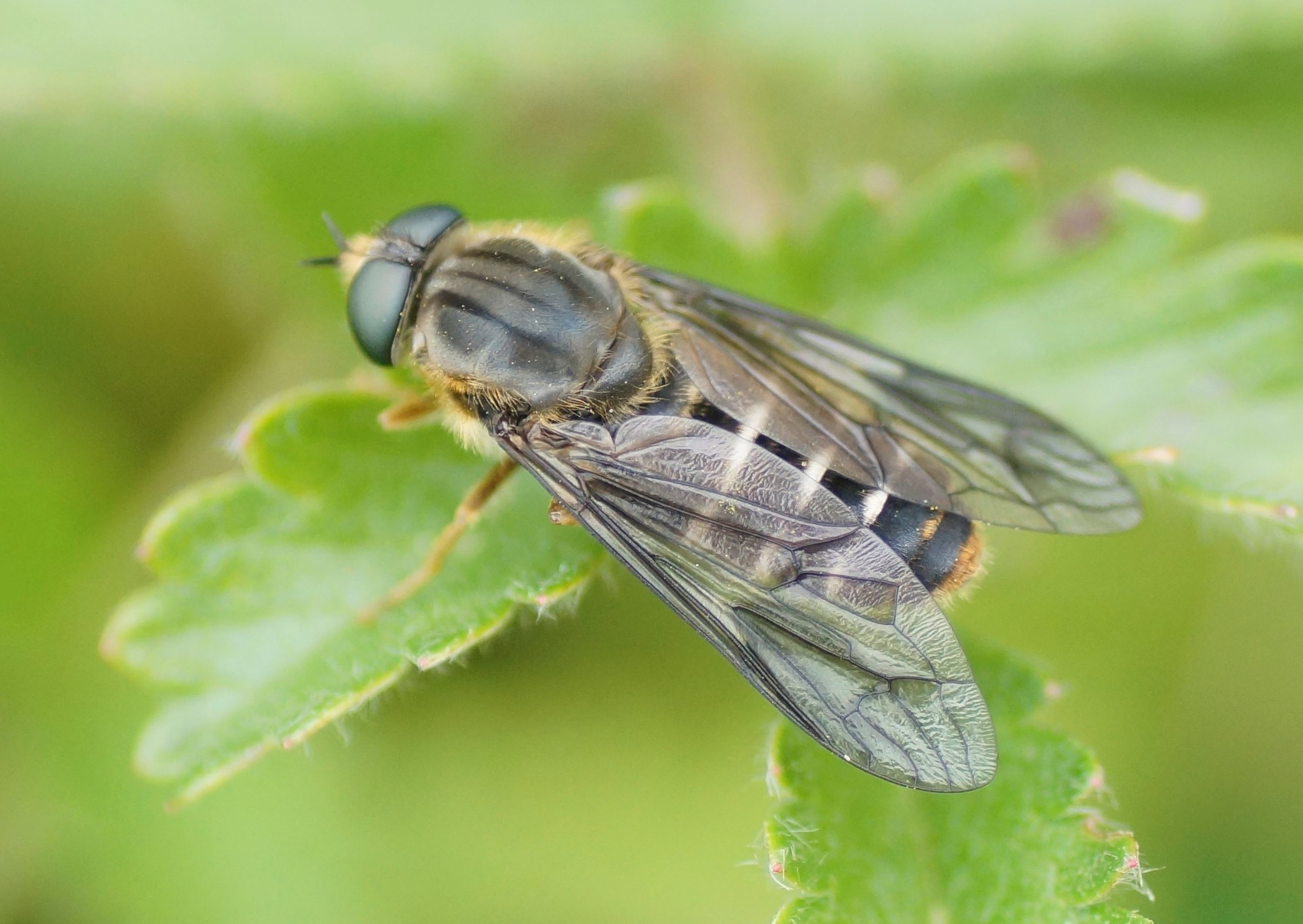

Scientific classification
- Kingdom: Animalia
- Phylum: Arthropoda
- Clade: Pancrustacea
- Class: Insecta
- Order: Diptera
- Superfamily: Xylophagoidea
- Family: Xylophagidae
- Genus: Exeretonevra; Macquart, 1846

Type species
- Exeretonevra maculipennis Macquart, 1846

= Exeretonevra =

Genus of flies

Exeretonevra is a genus of flies in the family Xylophagidae.

== Species ==
- Exeretonevra angustifrons Hardy, 1924
- Exeretonevra maculipennis Macquart, 1846
- Exeretonevra tertia Paramonov, 1953
- Exeretonevra zentae Paramonov, 1953
