= Odontosabula =

Scientific classification
- Kingdom: Animalia
- Phylum: Arthropoda
- Clade: Pancrustacea
- Class: Insecta
- Order: Diptera
- Superfamily: Xylophagoidea
- Family: Xylophagidae
- Genus: Odontosabula; Matsumura, 1905

Type species
- Odontosabula gloriosa Matsumura, 1905

Genus of flies

Odontosabula is a genus of flies in the family Xylophagidae.

== Species ==
- Odontosabula czerskii (Pleske, 1925)
- Odontosabula decora Nagatomi, 1985
- Odontosabula fulvipilosa Nagatomi, 1985
- Odontosabula gloriosa Matsumura, 1905
- Odontosabula licenti (Séguy, 1952)
