= Heterostomus =

Scientific classification
- Kingdom: Animalia
- Phylum: Arthropoda
- Clade: Pancrustacea
- Class: Insecta
- Order: Diptera
- Family: Xylophagidae
- Genus: Heterostomus; Bigot, 1857
- Species: H. curvipalpis

Binomial name
- Heterostomus curvipalpis Bigot, 1857

Genus of flies

Heterostomus is a genus of flies in the family Xylophagidae. It includes a single species, Heterostomus curvipalpis, known from Chile. It has a reddish-brown pupa with black spines.

Some authors have placed Heterostomus in its own family: Heterostomidae. Woodley (2011) states that because its larvae are unknown, its family placement within Xylophagidae remains uncertain.

== Distribution ==
Chile.
