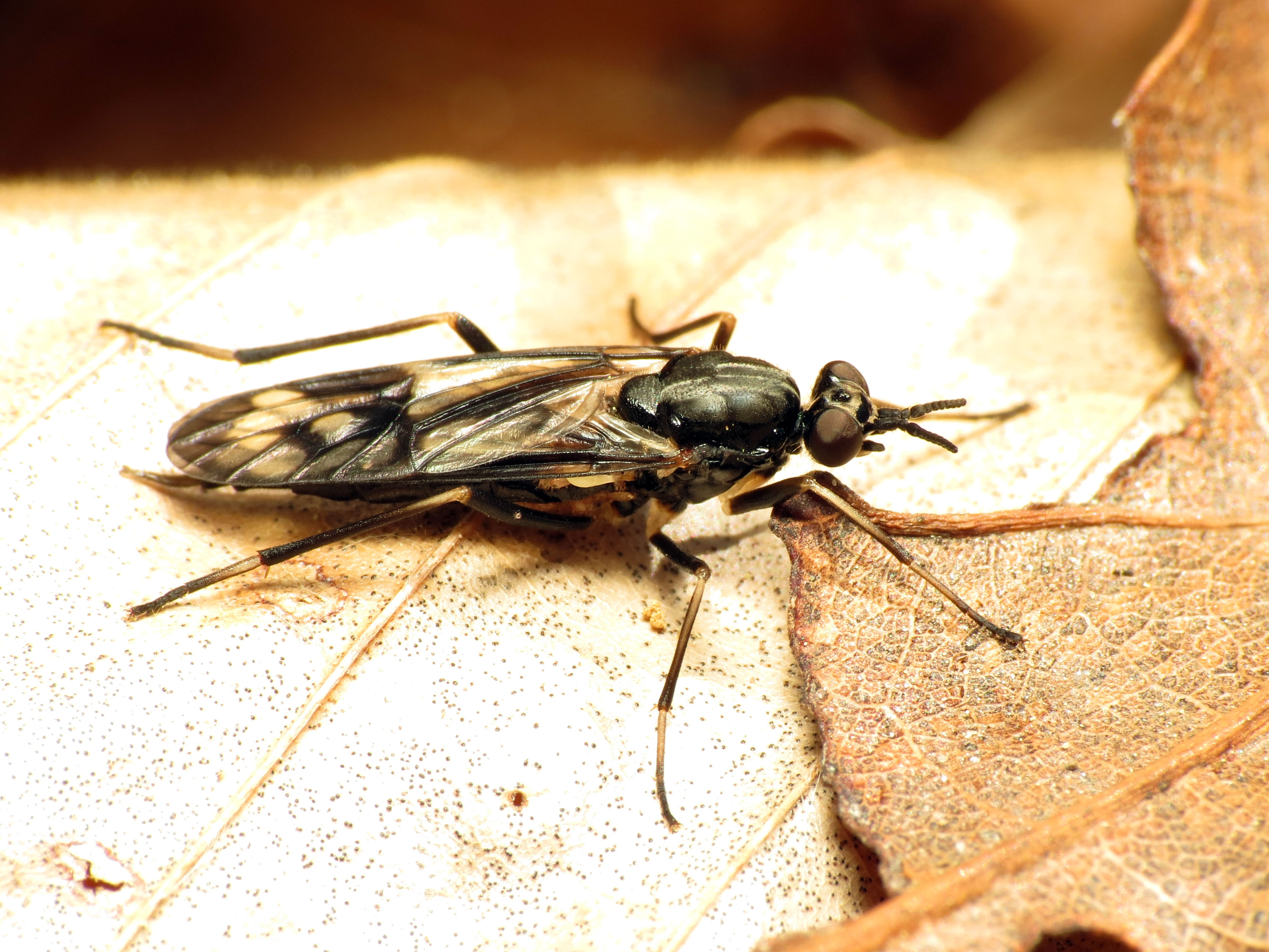
- Xylophagus lugens

Scientific classification
- Kingdom: Animalia
- Phylum: Arthropoda
- Class: Insecta
- Order: Diptera
- Family: Xylophagidae
- Genus: Xylophagus; Meigen, 1803

= Xylophagus =

Genus of flies

Xylophagus is a genus of flies in the family Xylophagidae.

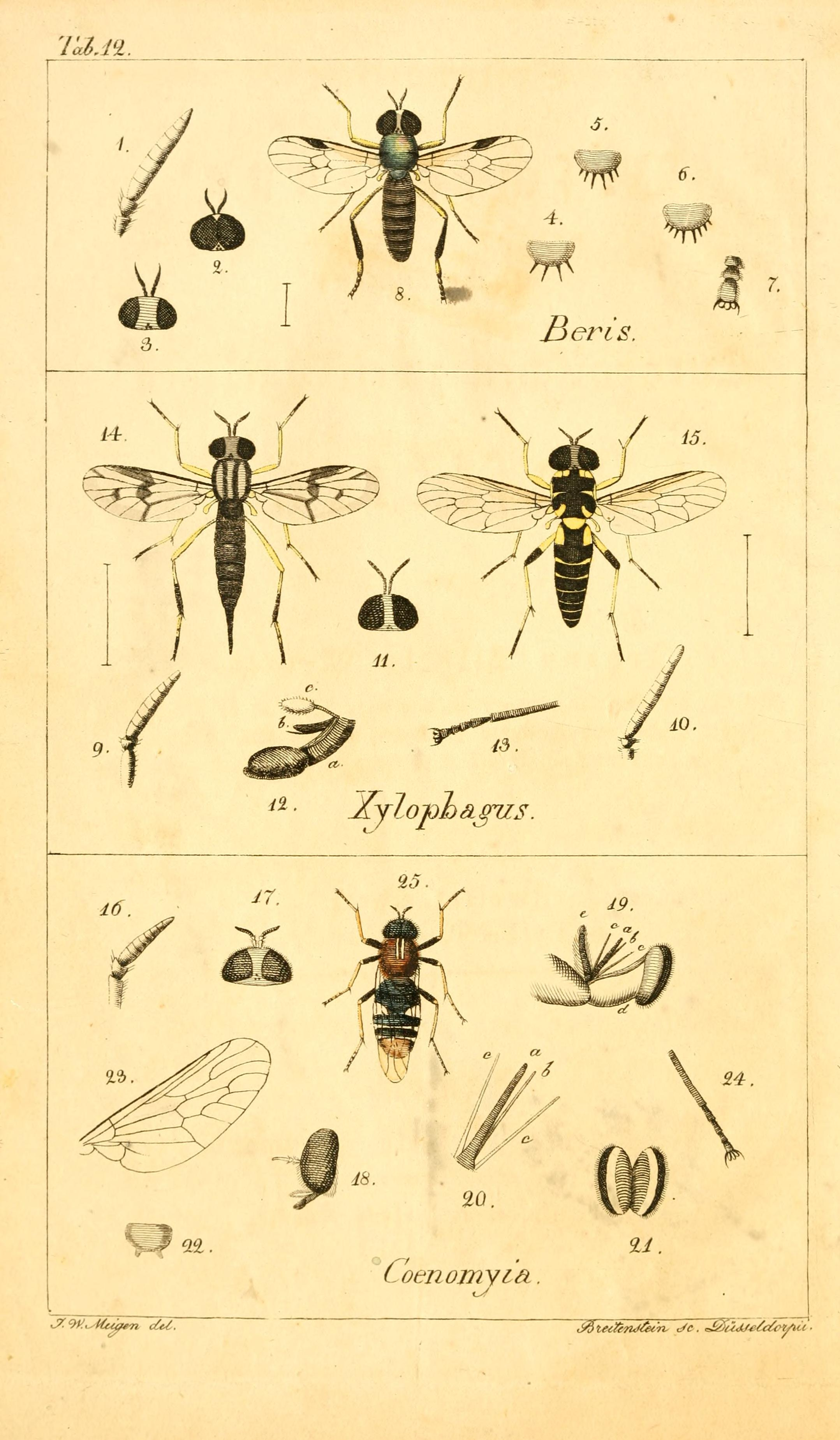
Xylophagus in Meigen Systematische Beschreibung der bekannten europäischen zweiflügeligen Insekten Tome 2 1820

== Species ==
- Xylophagus admirandus Krivosheina & Mamaev, 1972
- Xylophagus albopilosus Miyatake, 1965
- Xylophagus ater Meigen, 1804
- Xylophagus bungei (Pleske, 1925)
- Xylophagus caucasicus Krivosheina & Mamaev, 1982
- Xylophagus cinctus (De Geer, 1776)
- Xylophagus compeditus Meigen & Wiedemann, 1820
- Xylophagus decorus Williston, 1885
- Xylophagus durango Woodley, 1994
- †Xylophagus eridanus Meunier, 1908
- Xylophagus fulgidus Webb, 1979
- Xylophagus gracilis Williston, 1885
- Xylophagus inermis Krivosheina & Krivosheina, 2000 (contra X. matsumurae [sic] ssp. inermis Krivosheina & Krivosheina, 2000 see Woodley, 2011)
- Xylophagus junki (Szilády, 1932)
- Xylophagus lugens Loew, 1863
- Xylophagus lukjanovitshi Krivosheina & Mamaev, 1972
- Xylophagus matsumuri Miyatake, 1965 (contra matsumurae [sic] in Krivosheina & Mamaev 1972: 440, or e.g. Krivosheina & Krivosheina, 2000)
- †Xylophagus mengeanus Giebel, 1856
- Xylophagus mongolicus Kovalev, 1982
- Xylophagus nitidus Adams, 1904
- Xylophagus nudatus Nagatomi & Saigusa, 1969
- Xylophagus reflectens Walker, 1848
- Xylophagus rufipes Loew, 1869
- Xylophagus sachalinensis (Pleske, 1925)
- Xylophagus sibiricus Krivosheina & Krivosheina, 2000
- Xylophagus signifer Krivosheina & Mamaev, 1972
