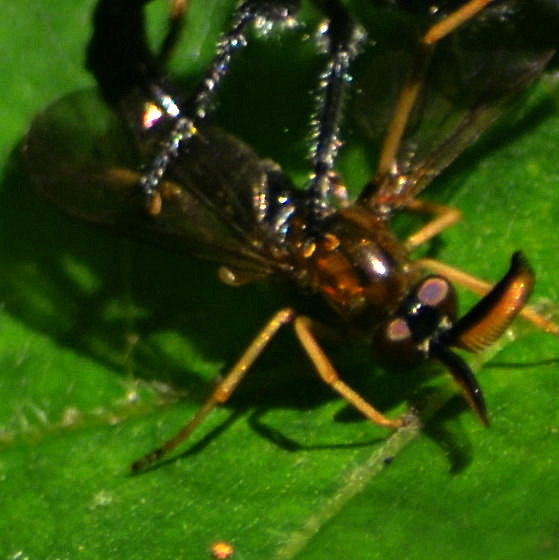

Scientific classification
- Kingdom: Animalia
- Phylum: Arthropoda
- Class: Insecta
- Order: Diptera
- Family: Xylophagidae
- Genus: Rachicerus
- Species: R. obscuripennis

Binomial name
- Rachicerus obscuripennis (Loew, 1863)

= Rachicerus obscuripennis =

Species of fly

Rachicerus obscuripennis is a North American Diptera of the Rachicerinae family. It is the only North American species with pectinate (comblike) flagellomeres (antenna segments).

== Distribution ==
United States.
