= Pseudopangonia =

Scientific classification
- Kingdom: Animalia
- Phylum: Arthropoda
- Clade: Pancrustacea
- Class: Insecta
- Order: Diptera
- Family: Tabanidae
- Subfamily: Chrysopsinae
- Tribe: Bouvieromyiini
- Genus: Pseudopangonia; Ricardo, 1915

Type species
- Pseudopangonia australis Ricardo, 1915

Genus of insects

Pseudopangonia is a genus of horse flies in the family Tabanidae.

== Distribution ==
New South Wales.

== Species ==
- Pseudopangonia australis Ricardo, 1915
