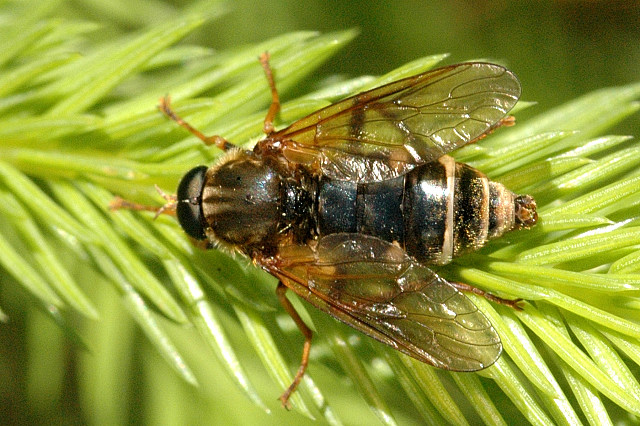

Scientific classification
- Kingdom: Animalia
- Phylum: Arthropoda
- Class: Insecta
- Order: Diptera
- Family: Xylophagidae
- Genus: Coenomyia
- Species: C. ferruginea

Binomial name
- Coenomyia ferruginea (Scopoli, 1763)

Synonyms
- Caenomyia cinereibarbis Bigot, 1879; Coenomyia pallida Say, 1824; Musca australis Gmelin, 1790; Musca ferruginea Scopoli, 1763; Musca grandis Schrank, 1837; Musca olens Fuessly, 1775; Sicus aureus Meigen, 1804; Sicus unicolor Meigen, 1804; Stratiomys crucis Fabricius, 1787; Stratiomys errans Fabricius, 1794; Stratiomys grandis Schrank, 1795; Stratiomys macroleon Panzer, 1793; Stratiomys major Schrank, 1795; Stratiomys olens Roemer, 1789; Stratiomys palatina Schrank, 1796; Stratiomys testacea Fabricius, 1787; Stratiomys unguiculata Panzer, 1793; Tabanus bicolor Fabricius, 1798; Tabanus bidens Fabricius, 1777; Tabanus bidentatus Fabricius, 1781; Tabanus bispinosus Fabricius, 1777

= Coenomyia ferruginea =

Species of fly

Coenomyia ferruginea is a species of fly in the family Xylophagidae.

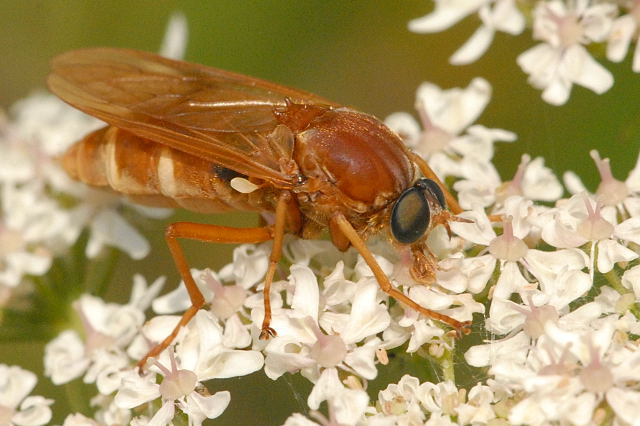

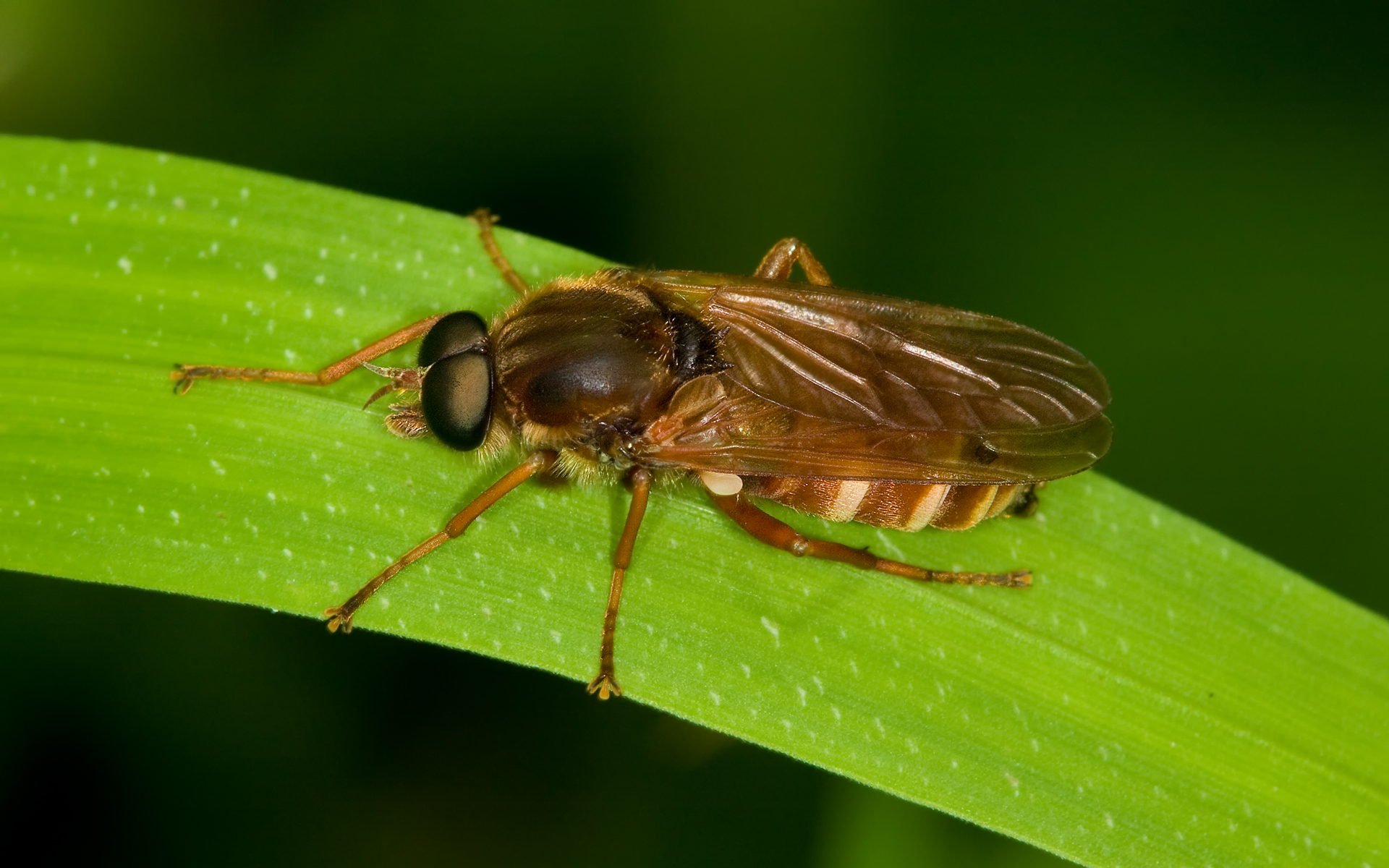

== Distribution ==
Europe, North America.
