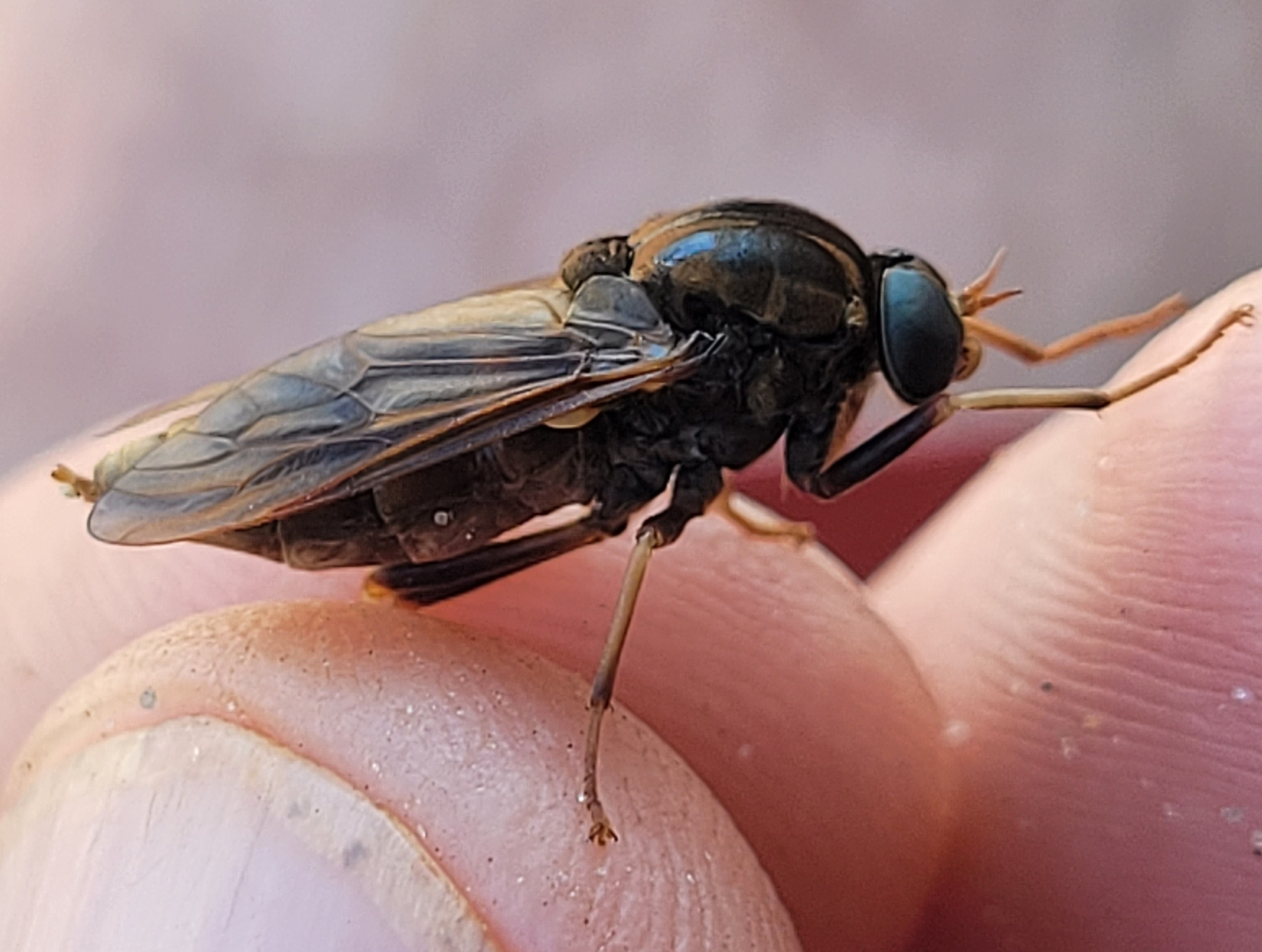
- Arthropeas magna

Scientific classification
- Kingdom: Animalia
- Phylum: Arthropoda
- Class: Insecta
- Order: Diptera
- Superfamily: Xylophagoidea
- Family: Xylophagidae
- Genus: Arthropeas; Loew, 1850

Type species
- Arthropeas sibirica Loew, 1850

Synonyms
- Arthropaeas Marschall, 1873

= Arthropeas =

Genus of flies

Arthropeas is a genus of flies in the family Xylophagidae.

== Species ==
- Arthropeas americana Loew, 1861
- Arthropeas fenestralis Malloch, 1932
- Arthropeas magna Johnson, 1913
- Arthropeas sachalinensis Matsumura, 1916
- Arthropeas semifusca Malloch, 1932
- Arthropeas sibirica Loew, 1850
