= Anacanthaspis =

Scientific classification
- Kingdom: Animalia
- Phylum: Arthropoda
- Class: Insecta
- Order: Diptera
- Superfamily: Xylophagoidea
- Family: Xylophagidae
- Genus: Anacanthaspis; Röder, 1889

Type species
- Anacanthaspis bifasciata Röder, 1889

Genus of flies

Anacanthaspis is a genus of flies in the family Xylophagidae.

== Species ==
- Anacanthaspis bifasciata Röder, 1889
- Anacanthaspis japonica Shiraki, 1932
