= Paulianomyia =

Scientific classification
- Kingdom: Animalia
- Phylum: Arthropoda
- Class: Insecta
- Order: Diptera
- Family: Tabanidae
- Subfamily: Chrysopsinae
- Tribe: Bouvieromyiini
- Genus: Paulianomyia; Oldroyd, 1957

Type species
- Paulianomyia rufa Oldroyd, 1957

Genus of insects

Paulianomyia is a genus of horse flies in the family Tabanidae.

== Distribution ==
Madagascar.

== Species ==
- Paulianomyia rufa Oldroyd, 1957
