= Merycomyia =

Scientific classification
- Domain: Eukaryota
- Kingdom: Animalia
- Phylum: Arthropoda
- Class: Insecta
- Order: Diptera
- Family: Tabanidae
- Subfamily: Chrysopsinae
- Tribe: Bouvieromyiini
- Genus: Merycomyia; Hine, 1912

Type species
- Merycomyia geminata Hine, 1912

Genus of flies

Merycomyia is a genus of North American deer flies in the family Tabanidae.

== Species ==
- Merycomyia brunnea Stone, 1953 - (Brown Merycomyian Tabanid Fly)
- Merycomyia whitneyi Johnson, 1904
