= Thaumastomyia =

Scientific classification
- Kingdom: Animalia
- Phylum: Arthropoda
- Class: Insecta
- Order: Diptera
- Family: Tabanidae
- Subfamily: Chrysopsinae
- Tribe: Bouvieromyiini
- Genus: Thaumastomyia; Philip & Mackerras, 1960

Type species
- Merycomyia haitiensis Stone, 1935

Genus of insects

Thaumastomyia is a genus of horse flies in the family Tabanidae.

== Species ==
- Thaumastomyia haitiensis (Stone, 1935)
