= Phibalomyia =

Scientific classification
- Kingdom: Animalia
- Phylum: Arthropoda
- Clade: Pancrustacea
- Class: Insecta
- Order: Diptera
- Family: Tabanidae
- Subfamily: Chrysopsinae
- Tribe: Bouvieromyiini
- Genus: Phibalomyia; Taylor, 1920

Type species
- Elaphromyia carteri Taylor, 1917

Synonyms
- Elaphromyia Taylor, 1917

Genus of insects

Phibalomyia is a genus of horse flies in the family Tabanidae.

== Distribution ==
Queensland.

== Species ==
- Phibalomyia carteri (Taylor, 1917)
