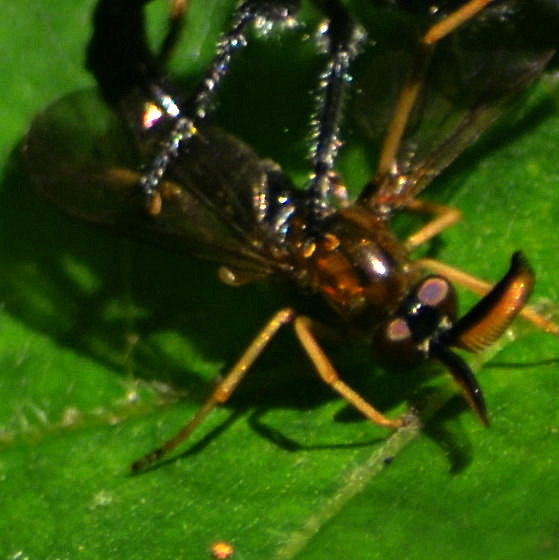
- Rachicerus obscuripennis

Scientific classification
- Kingdom: Animalia
- Phylum: Arthropoda
- Class: Insecta
- Order: Diptera
- Superfamily: Xylophagoidea
- Family: Xylophagidae
- Genus: Rachicerus; Walker, 1854

Type species
- Rachicerus fulvicollis Walker, 1854

Synonyms
- AntidoxaMarschall, 1873; AntidoxionSnellen von Vollenhoven, 1863; GymnorhachicerusFrey, 1954; PaleorachicerusNagatomi, 1970; RachicerellaCarrera, 1945; RachicerusWalker, 1848; RhachicerellaEnderlein, 1921; RhachicerusLoew, 1872; RhacicerusMalloch, 1917; RhyphomorphaWalker, 1861

= Rachicerus =

Genus of flies

Rachicerus is a genus of flies in the family Xylophagidae.

== Species ==
- Rachicerus amorosus Nagatomi, 1982
- Rachicerus anachoreticus Nagatomi, 1982
- Rachicerus aterrimus Senior-White, 1924
- Rachicerus bellus Osten Sacken, 1886
- Rachicerus bicolor Brunetti, 1912
- Rachicerus bifidus Nagatomi, 1970
- Rachicerus bilineus (Walker, 1861)
- Rachicerus boarius Nagatomi, 1970
- Rachicerus brevicornis Kertész, 1914
- Rachicerus carrerai Pujol-Luz, 2019
- Rachicerus endymion Nagatomi, 1970
- Rachicerus fenestratus Kertész, 1914
- Rachicerus flabellum Nagatomi, 1970
- Rachicerus flavomaculatus (Leonard, 1930)
- Rachicerus fluidus Nagatomi, 1970
- Rachicerus formosus (Loew, 1850)
- Rachicerus fulvicollis Walker, 1854
- Rachicerus fulvicornis (Snellen van Vollenhoven, 1863)
- Rachicerus galloisi Séguy, 1948
- Rachicerus guttatus Nagatomi, 1970
- Rachicerus hainanensis Yang & Yang, 2002
- Rachicerus honestus Osten Sacken, 1877
- Rachicerus kotoshensis Nagatomi, 1970
- Rachicerus lanei Carrera, 1940
- Rachicerus lepidus Nagatomi, 1982
- Rachicerus lopesi Carrera, 1940
- Rachicerus maai Nagatomi, 1970
- Rachicerus maculipennis Frey, 1954
- Rachicerus marcusi Carrera, 1940
- Rachicerus miyatakei Nagatomi, 1970
- Rachicerus nigellus Nagatomi, 1970
- Rachicerus niger Leonard, 1930
- Rachicerus nigricornis Brunetti, 1920
- Rachicerus nigrinus Wandolleck, 1897
- Rachicerus nigripalpus Loew, 1874
- Rachicerus nimbosus Nagatomi, 1970
- Rachicerus nitidus Johnson, 1903
- Rachicerus obatratus Nagatomi, 1970
- Rachicerus obscuripennis Loew, 1863
- Rachicerus oliverioi Carrera, 1940
- Rachicerus omissinervis Meijere, 1916
- Rachicerus opiparus Nagatomi, 1970
- Rachicerus opulentus Nagatomi, 1970
- Rachicerus orientalis Ôuchi, 1938
- Rachicerus pantherinus Nagatomi, 1970
- Rachicerus patagiatus Enderlein, 1913
- Rachicerus pauciarticulatus Frey, 1954
- Rachicerus picticornis Kertész, 1923
- Rachicerus pictipennis Kertész, 1914
- Rachicerus pilosus (Frey, 1954)
- Rachicerus plagosus Nagatomi, 1970
- Rachicerus proximus Kertész, 1914
- Rachicerus pullus Nagatomi, 1970
- Rachicerus quatei Nagatomi, 1982
- Rachicerus relictus (Frey, 1954)
- Rachicerus robinsoni Edwards, 1919
- Rachicerus robustus Frey, 1954
- Rachicerus rusticus Nagatomi, 1970
- Rachicerus sakishimanus Nagatomi, 1982
- Rachicerus samuelsoni Nagatomi, 1982
- Rachicerus shannoni Carrera, 1945
- Rachicerus solivagus Nagatomi, 1970
- Rachicerus spissus Nagatomi, 1970
- Rachicerus steffani Nagatomi, 1982
- Rachicerus tenuiculus Nagatomi, 1970
- Rachicerus tenuis Nagatomi, 1970
- Rachicerus tigrinus Nagatomi, 1970
- Rachicerus tristis Loew, 1869
- Rachicerus unicinctus Brunetti, 1920
- Rachicerus varipes Loew, 1863
- Rachicerus varius Nagatomi, 1970
- Rachicerus zonatus Osten Sacken, 1881
