= Bouvieromyiini =

Scientific classification
- Domain: Eukaryota
- Kingdom: Animalia
- Phylum: Arthropoda
- Class: Insecta
- Order: Diptera
- Family: Tabanidae
- Subfamily: Chrysopsinae
- Tribe: Bouvieromyiini; Séguy, 1949

Tribe of insects

Bouvieromyiini is a tribe of horse flies in the family Tabanidae.

== Genera ==
- Aegophagamyia Austen, 1912
- Eucompsa Enderlein, 1922
- Gressittia Philip & Mackerras, 1960
- Merycomyia Hine, 1912
- Paulianomyia Oldroyd, 1957
- Phibalomyia Taylor, 1920
- Pseudopangonia Ricardo, 1915
- Pseudotabanus Ricardo, 1915
- Rhigioglossa Wiedemann, 1828
- Thaumastomyia Philip & Mackerras, 1960
