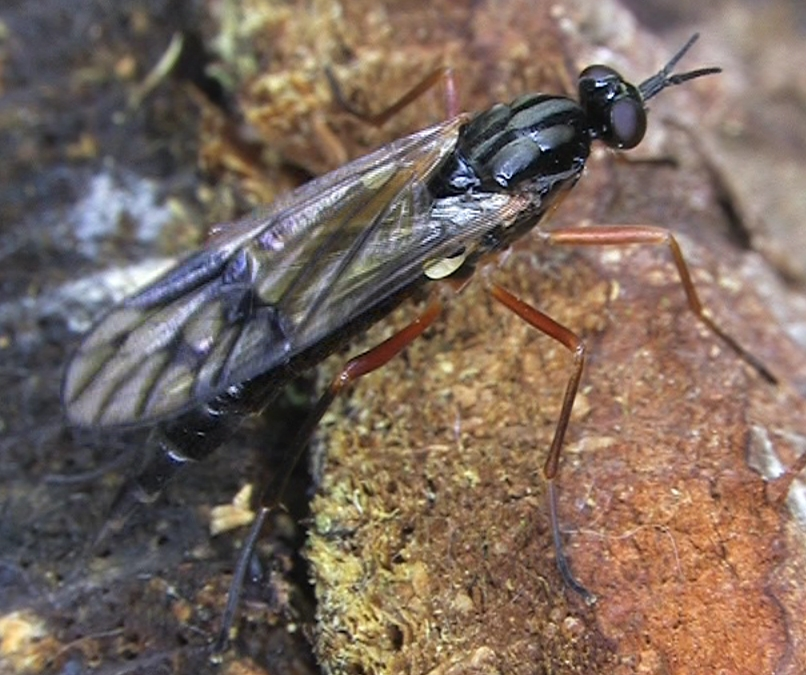

Scientific classification
- Kingdom: Animalia
- Phylum: Arthropoda
- Clade: Pancrustacea
- Class: Insecta
- Order: Diptera
- Family: Xylophagidae
- Genus: Xylophagus
- Species: X. ater

Binomial name
- Xylophagus ater Meigen, 1804

Synonyms
- Rhachicerus aterrimus Senior-White, 1924; Erinna kowarzi Pleske, 1925

= Xylophagus ater =

Species of awl fly

Pairing

Oviposition

Xylophagus ater is a species of awl fly belonging to the family Xylophagidae found in Central Europe and North Europe.

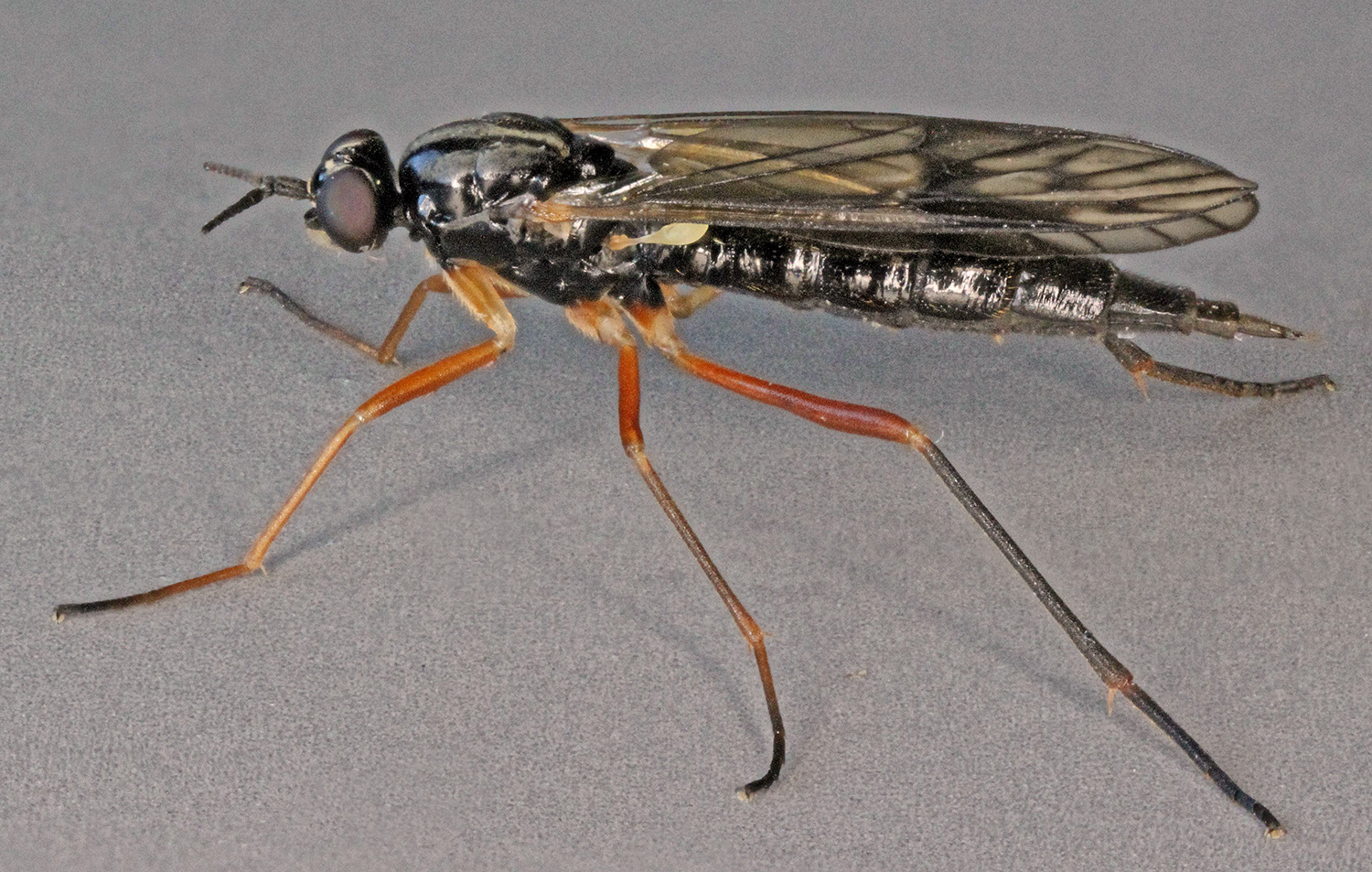

== Description ==
It is a glossy black fly resembling a pimpline ichneumon. The femora are yellow with a brown tip. The tibiae and tarsi are brown.The wings have a clouded band. The basal segment of the antenna is long, the length at least three times the width. In males the mesonotum is finely sculptured, shining, with two inconspicuous stripes of golden hairs. Females have three pollinose stripes on the mesonotum. The body length is 8 (male) to 15 millimeters (female).

== Biology ==
Larvae of Xylophagus ater are predatory. They feed on beetle larvae of the families Cerambycidae and Pyrochroidae which develop in dead branches of a wide variety of broadleaved trees.
