= Ernst Evald Bergroth =

Finnish entomologist (1857–1925)

Ernst Evald Bergroth (April 1, 1857 – November 22, 1925) was a Finnish physician and amateur entomologist.

== Life and medical career ==
Bergroth was born on April 1, 1857, in Jakobstad, Finland and studied at the University in Helsinki. He then went to Stockholm to study medicine and science, graduating in 1886, and took up a job as a doctor in Tammela. From 1893 to 1905, he worked in Tampere, and from 1906 to 1911, he worked in Duluth, Minnesota. After his return to Finland, Bergroth lived in Turtola (now Pello), Jämsä and finally Ekenäs, until his death on November 22, 1925.

== Scientific career ==
Even as a young student, Bergroth was interested in natural history, and joined the Societas pro Fauna et Flora Fennica in 1875. In 1877, he took part in a research expedition up the Yenisei River to Siberia. He specialised in the craneflies of the family Tipulidae and bugs of the suborder Heteroptera, and published more than 300 papers in his lifetime. He was fluent in many languages, and wrote in German, Latin, English, French, Swedish and Italian.
