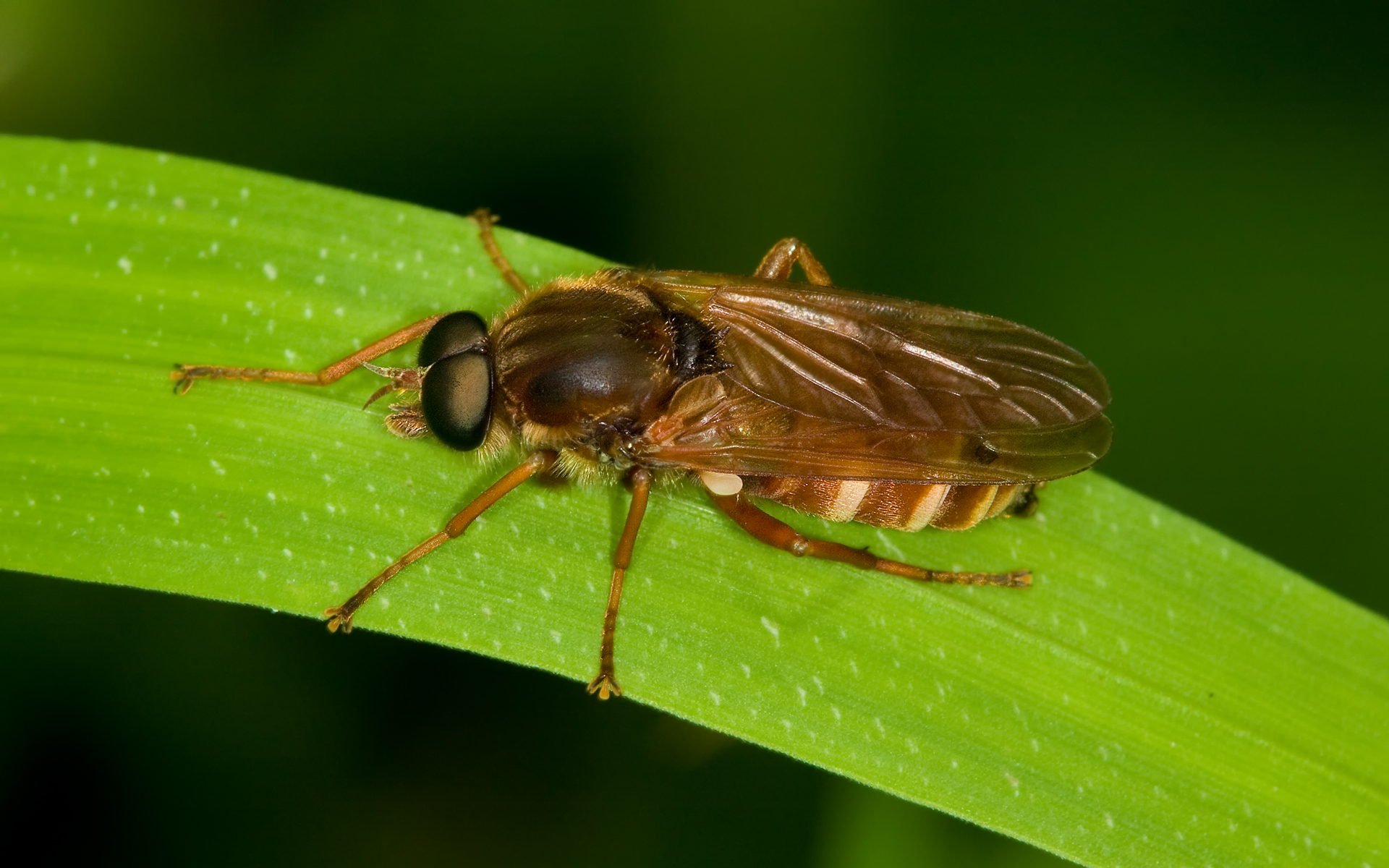
- Coenomyia ferruginea

Scientific classification
- Kingdom: Animalia
- Phylum: Arthropoda
- Class: Insecta
- Order: Diptera
- Suborder: Brachycera
- Infraorder: Xylophagomorpha
- Superfamily: Xylophagoidea
- Family: Xylophagidae; Fallén, 1810

Subfamilies
- Coenomyiinae; Rachicerinae; Xylophaginae

= Xylophagidae =

Family of flies

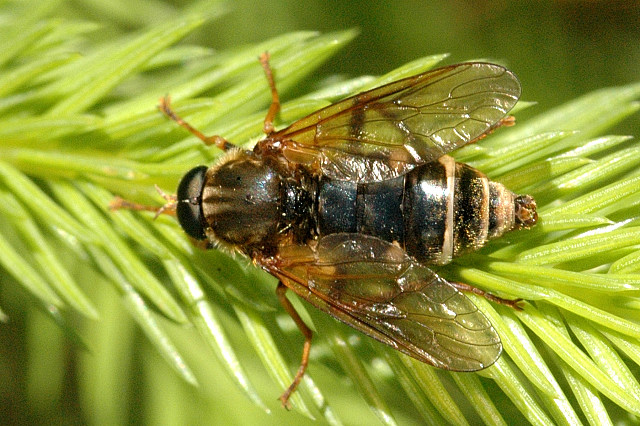
Coenomyia ferruginea

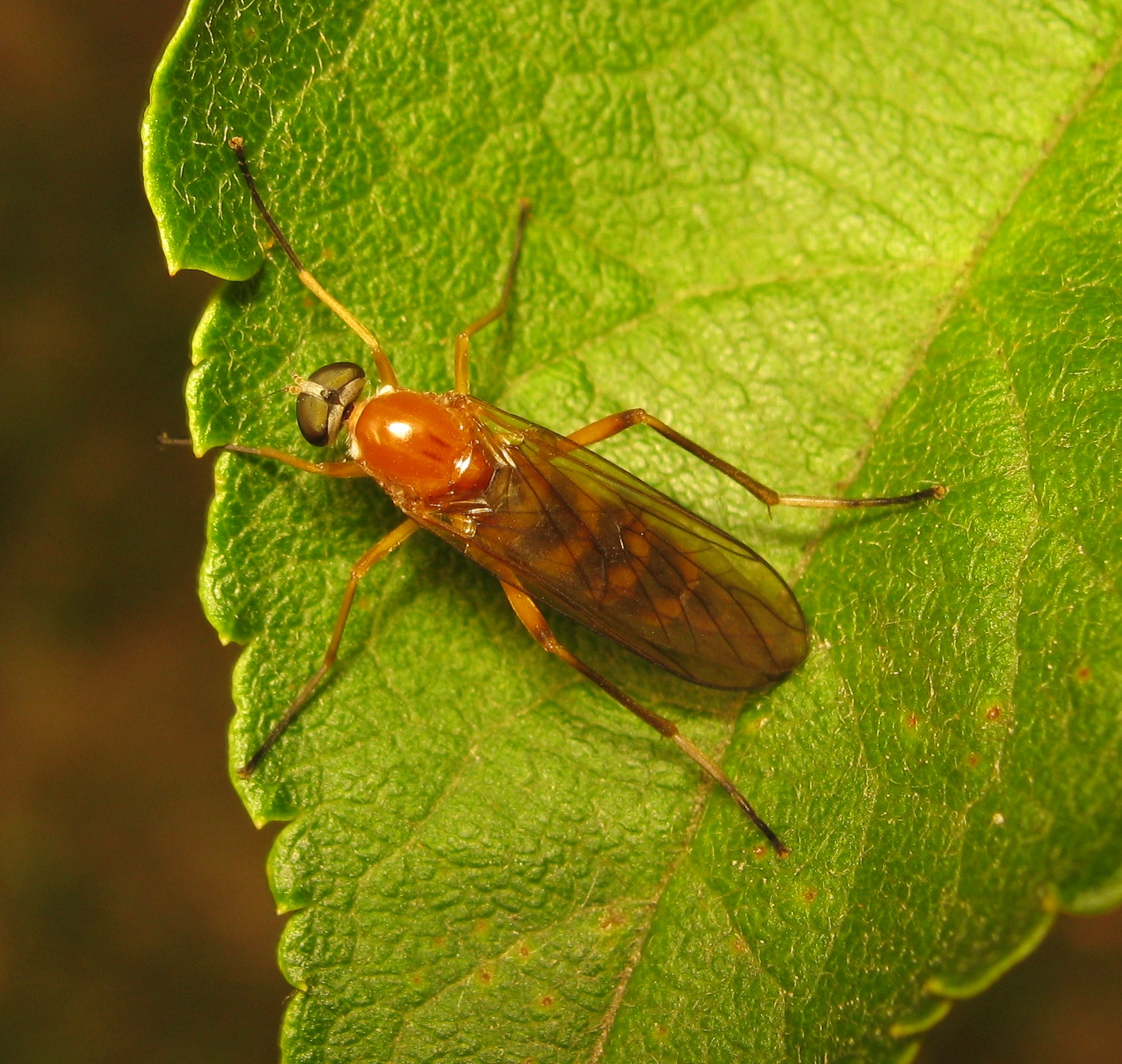
Dialysis elongata

The Brachyceran infraorder Xylophagomorpha is a small group that consists solely of the family Xylophagidae, which presently contains subfamilies that were sometimes considered to be two small related families (Coenomyiidae and Rachiceridae). Other obsolete names for members of this family include Exeretonevridae and Heterostomidae.

The family is known by the English name awl-flies.

The larvae are often predatory, consuming other insect larvae living in rotting wood.

== Description ==
Flies in this family have elongated bodies and resemble ichneumon wasps in shape. The base of the abdomen is constricted. The antennae have three segments.

== Genera ==
These nine genera belong to the family Xylophagidae:

- Anacanthaspis Röder, 1889
- Arthropeas Loew, 1850
- Coenomyia Latreille, 1797
- Dialysis Walker in Saunders, 1850
- Exeretonevra Macquart, 1846
- Heterostomus Bigot, 1857
- Odontosabula Matsumura, 1905
- Rachicerus Walker, 1854
- Xylophagus Meigen, 1803

== Gallery ==
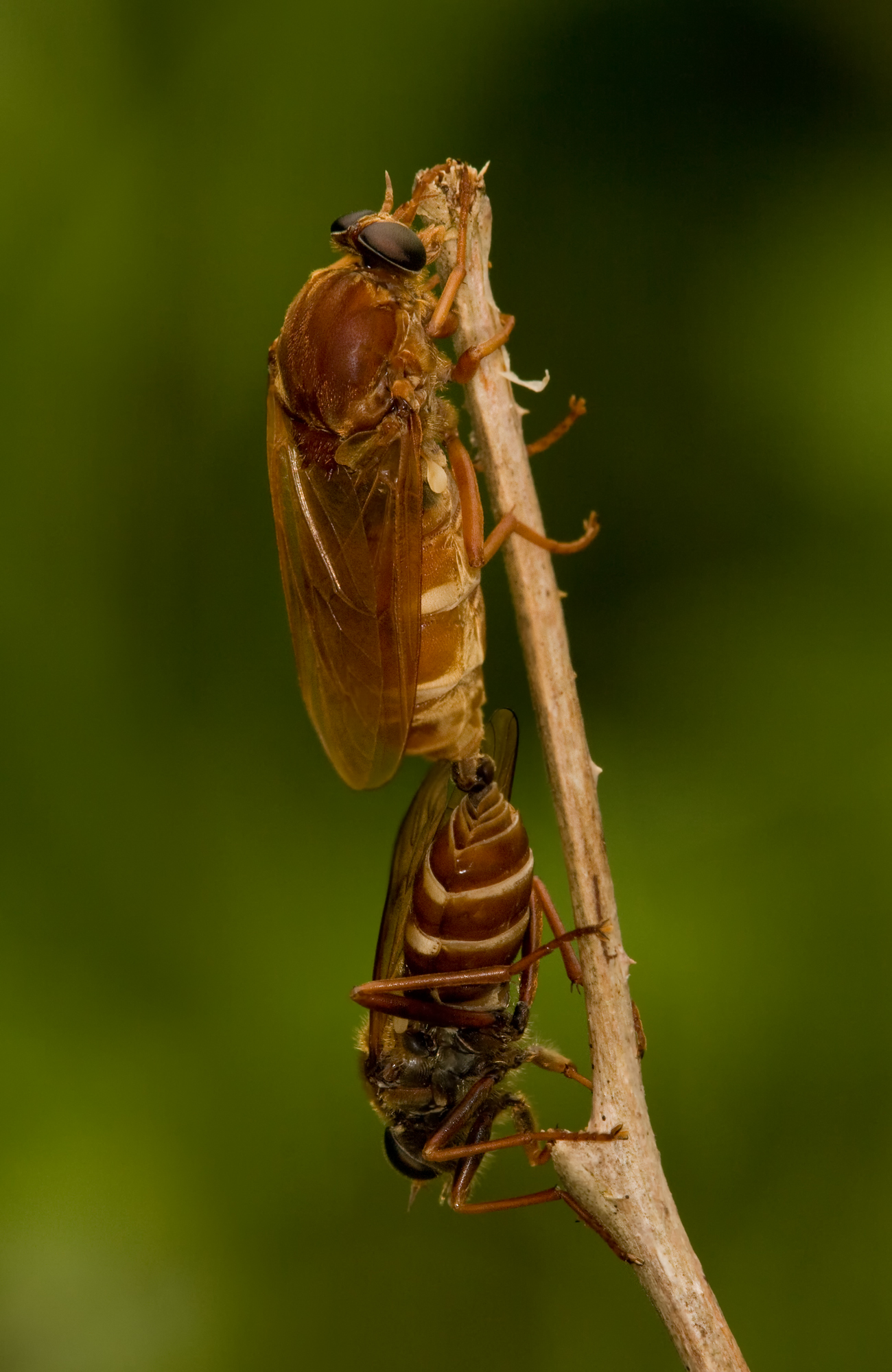
Coenomyia ferruginea mating

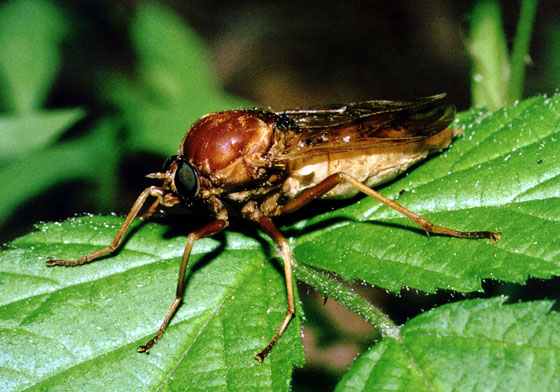
Coenomyia ferruginea

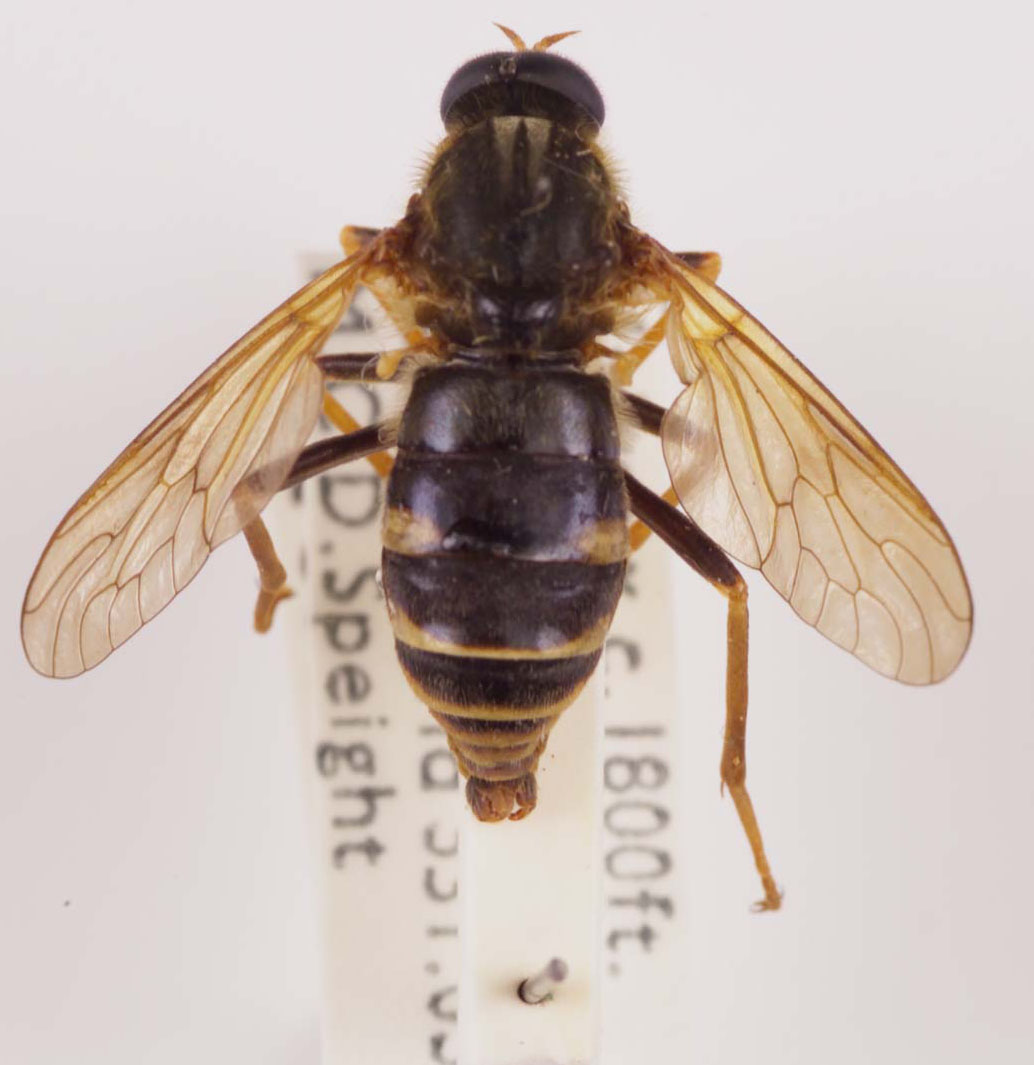
Museum specimen of Coenomyia ferruginea

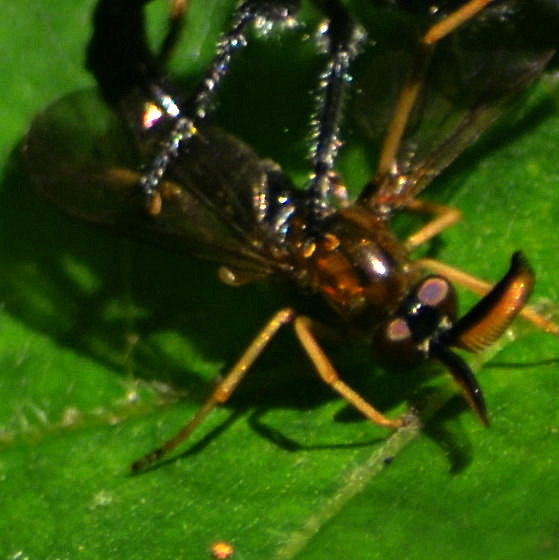
Rachicerus obscuripennis being eaten by a robber fly

Xylophagus ater oviposting
