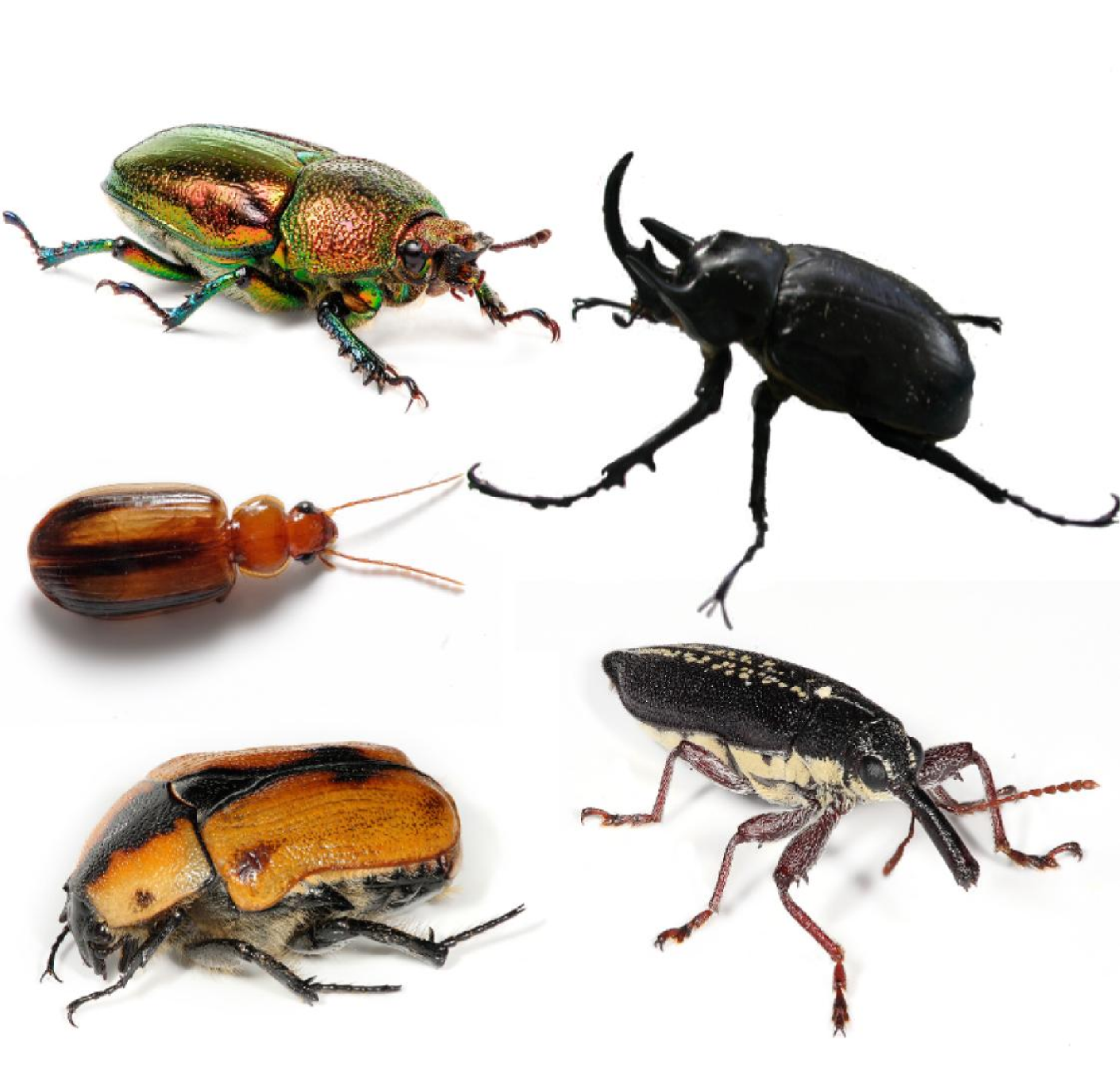
- Clockwise from top left: female golden stag beetle (Lamprima aurata), rhinoceros beetle (Megasoma sp.), long nose weevil (Rhinotia hemistictus), cowboy beetle (Chondropyga dorsalis), and a species of Amblytelus

Scientific classification
- Kingdom: Animalia
- Phylum: Arthropoda
- Clade: Pancrustacea
- Class: Insecta
- Clade: Coleopterida
- Order: Coleoptera; Linnaeus, 1758

Suborders
- Adephaga; Archostemata; Myxophaga; Polyphaga; †Protocoleoptera; See subgroups of the order Coleoptera

= Beetle =

Beetle Temporal range: 299–0 Ma Earliest Permian–Present

Order of insects

Beetles are insects that form the order Coleoptera (/koʊliːˈɒptɛrə/), in the superorder Holometabola. Their front pair of wings are hardened into wing-cases, elytra, distinguishing them from most other insects. The Coleoptera, with about 400,000 described species, is the largest of all orders, constituting almost 40% of described arthropods and 25% of all known animal species; new species are discovered frequently, with estimates suggesting that there are between 0.9 and 2.1 million total species.

Found in almost every habitat except the sea and the polar regions, they interact with their ecosystems in several ways: beetles often feed on plants and fungi, break down animal and plant debris, and eat other invertebrates. Some species are serious agricultural pests, such as the Colorado potato beetle, while others such as Coccinellidae (ladybirds or ladybugs) eat aphids, scale insects, thrips, and other plant-sucking insects that damage crops. Some others also have unusual characteristics, such as fireflies, which use a light-emitting organ for mating and communication purposes.

Beetles typically have a particularly hard exoskeleton including the elytra, though some such as the rove beetles have very short elytra while blister beetles have softer elytra. The general anatomy of a beetle is quite uniform and typical of insects, although there are several examples of novelty, such as adaptations in water beetles which trap air bubbles under the elytra for use while diving. Beetles are holometabolans, which means that they undergo complete metamorphosis, with a series of conspicuous and relatively abrupt changes in body structure between hatching and becoming adult after a relatively immobile pupal stage. Some, such as stag beetles, have a marked sexual dimorphism, the males possessing enormously enlarged mandibles which they use to fight other males. Many beetles are aposematic, with bright colors and patterns warning of their toxicity, while others are harmless Batesian mimics of such insects. Many beetles, including those that live in sandy places, have effective camouflage.

Beetles are prominent in human culture, from the sacred scarabs of ancient Egypt to beetlewing art and use as pets or fighting insects for entertainment and gambling. Many beetle groups are brightly and attractively colored making them objects of collection and decorative displays. Over 300 species are used as food, mostly as larvae; species widely consumed include mealworms and rhinoceros beetle larvae. However, the major impact of beetles on human life is as agricultural, forestry, and horticultural pests. Serious pest species include the boll weevil of cotton, the Colorado potato beetle, the coconut hispine beetle, the mountain pine beetle, and many others. Most beetles, however, do not cause economic damage and some, such as numerous species of lady beetles, are beneficial by helping to control insect pests. The scientific study of beetles is known as coleopterology.

== Etymology ==
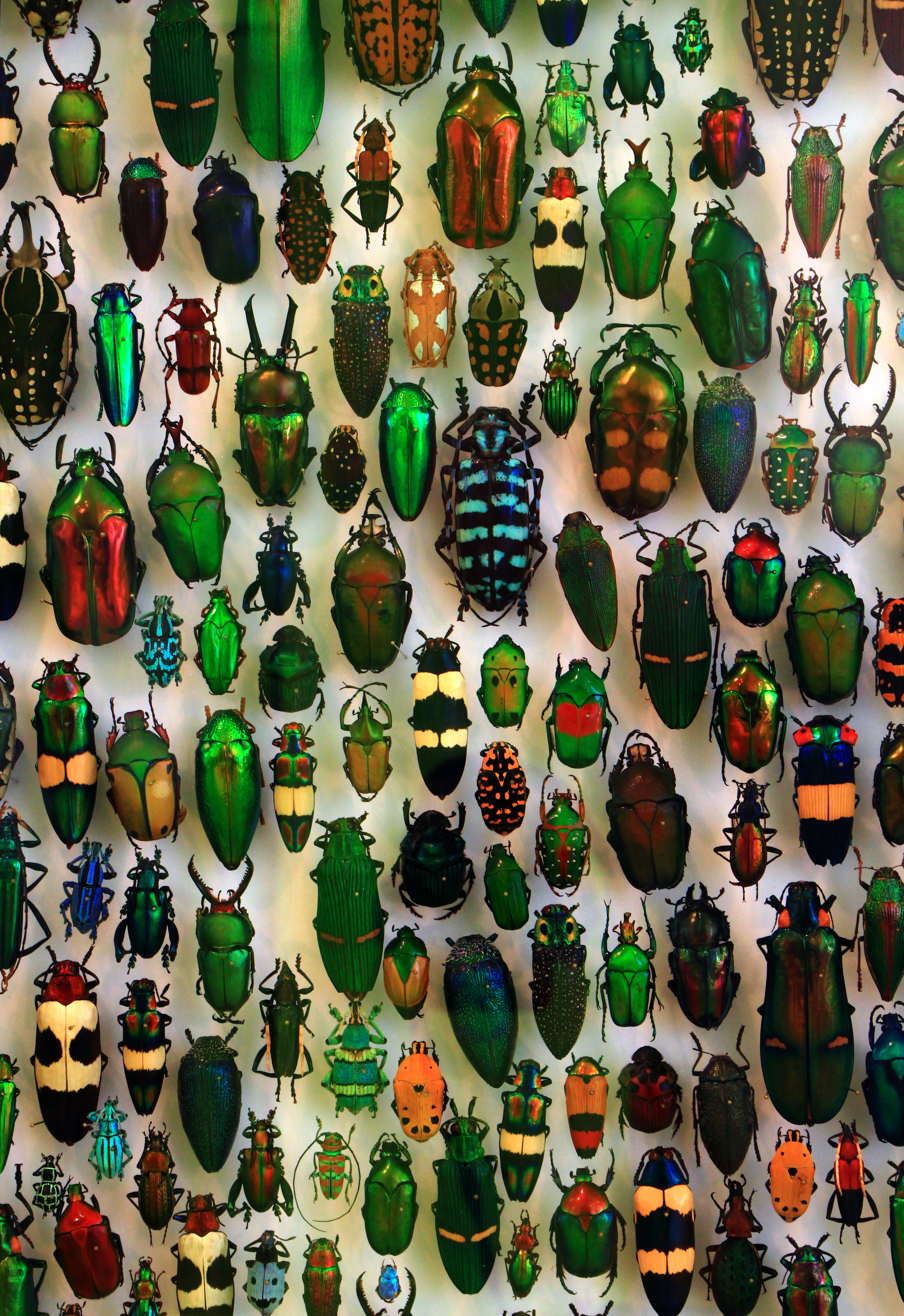
Coleoptera at the State Museum of Natural History, Karlsruhe, Germany

The name of the taxonomic order, Coleoptera, comes from the Greek koleopteros (κολεόπτερος), given to the group by Aristotle for their elytra, hardened shield-like forewings, from koleos, sheath, and pteron, wing. The English name beetle comes from the Old English word bitela, little biter, related to bītan (to bite), leading to Middle English betylle. Another Old English name for beetle is ċeafor, chafer, used in names such as cockchafer, from the Proto-Germanic *kebrô ("beetle"; compare German Käfer, Dutch kever, Afrikaans kewer).

== Distribution and diversity ==
Beetles are by far the largest order of insects: the roughly 400,000 species make up about 40% of all arthropod species so far described, and about 25% of all animal species. A 2015 study provided four independent estimates of the total number of beetle species, giving a mean estimate of some 1.5 million with a "surprisingly narrow range" spanning all four estimates from 0.9 to 2.1 million beetle species. The four estimates made use of host-specificity relationships (1.5 to 1.9 million), ratios with other taxa (0.9 to 1.2 million), plant:beetle ratios (1.2 to 1.3), and extrapolations based on body size by year of description (1.7 to 2.1 million). This immense diversity led the evolutionary biologist J. B. S. Haldane to quip, when some theologians asked him what could be inferred about the mind of the Christian God from the works of His Creation, "An inordinate fondness for beetles".

However, the ranking of beetles as most diverse has been challenged. Multiple studies posit that Diptera (flies) and/or Hymenoptera (sawflies, wasps, ants and bees) may have more species.

Beetles are found in nearly all habitats, including freshwater and coastal habitats, wherever vegetative foliage is found, from trees and their bark to flowers, leaves, and underground near roots – even inside plants in galls, in every plant tissue, including dead or decaying ones. Tropical forest canopies have a large and diverse fauna of beetles, including Carabidae, Chrysomelidae, and Scarabaeidae.

Among the heaviest beetles, whose larval stage can attain a mass of at least 115 g (4.1 oz) and a length of 11.5 cm (4.5 in), is the goliath beetle, Goliathus goliatus; in its adult stage it can weigh 70–100 g (2.5–3.5 oz) and reach up to 11 cm (4.3 in) in length. Adult elephant beetles, Megasoma elephas and Megasoma actaeon often reach 50 g (1.8 oz) and 10 cm (3.9 in).

The longest beetle is the Hercules beetle Dynastes hercules, with a maximum overall length of at least 16.7 cm (6.6 in) including the very long pronotal horn. The smallest recorded beetle and the smallest free-living insect (as of 2015), is the featherwing beetle Scydosella musawasensis which may measure as little as 325 μm in length.

Largest and smallest

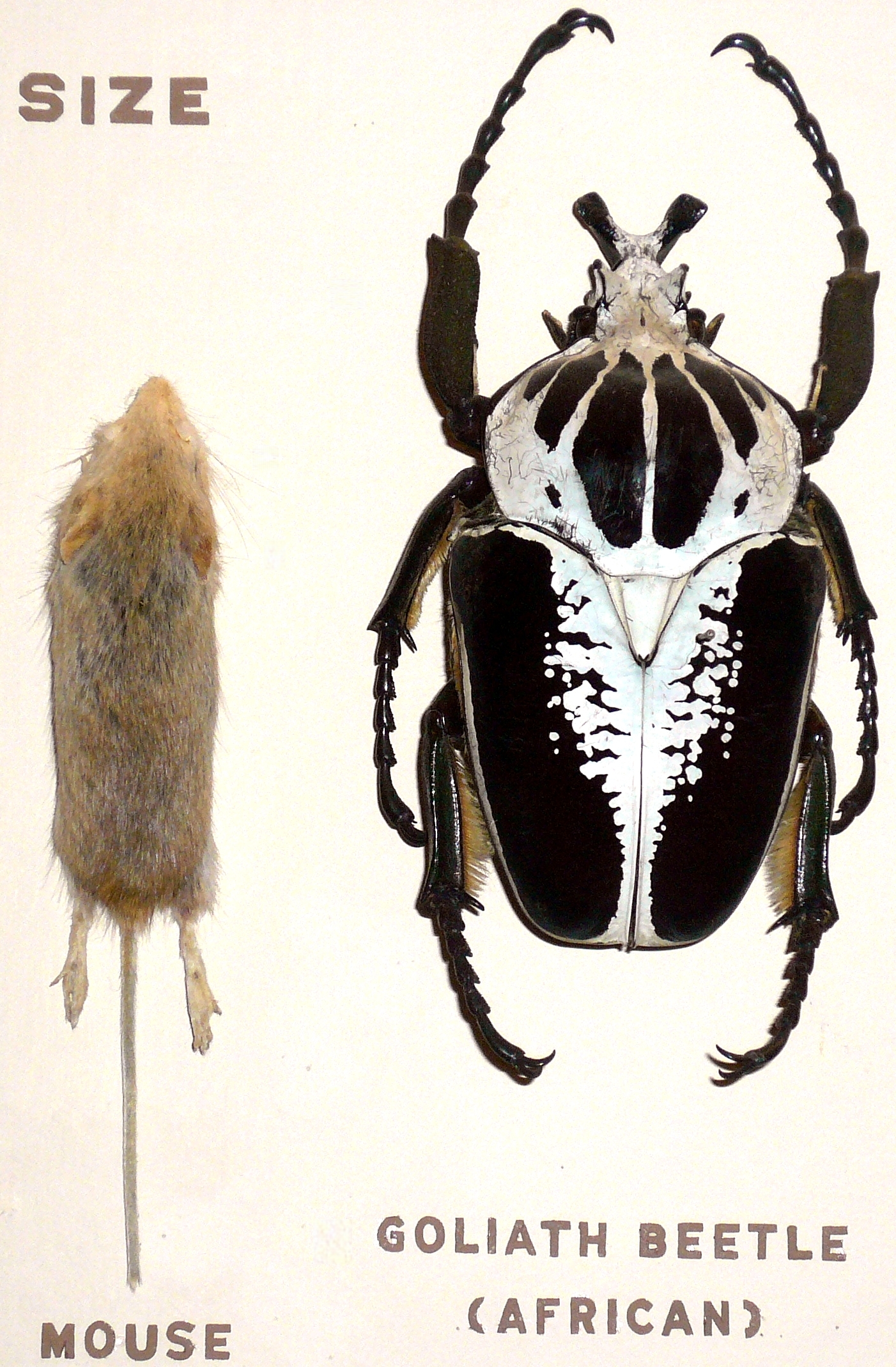
Royal goliath beetle, Goliathus regius, compared to a mouse

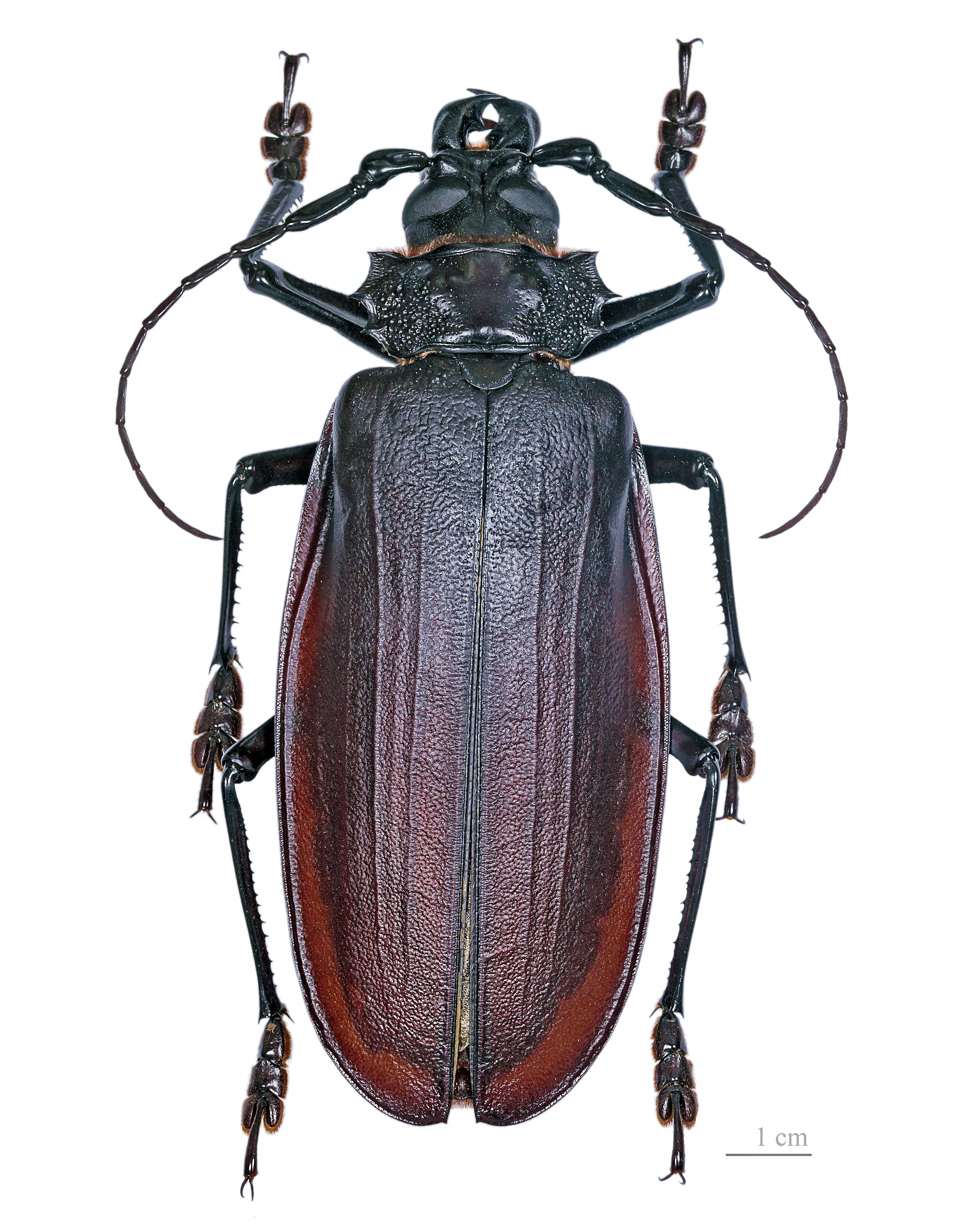
Titan beetle, Titanus giganteus, a tropical longhorn beetle

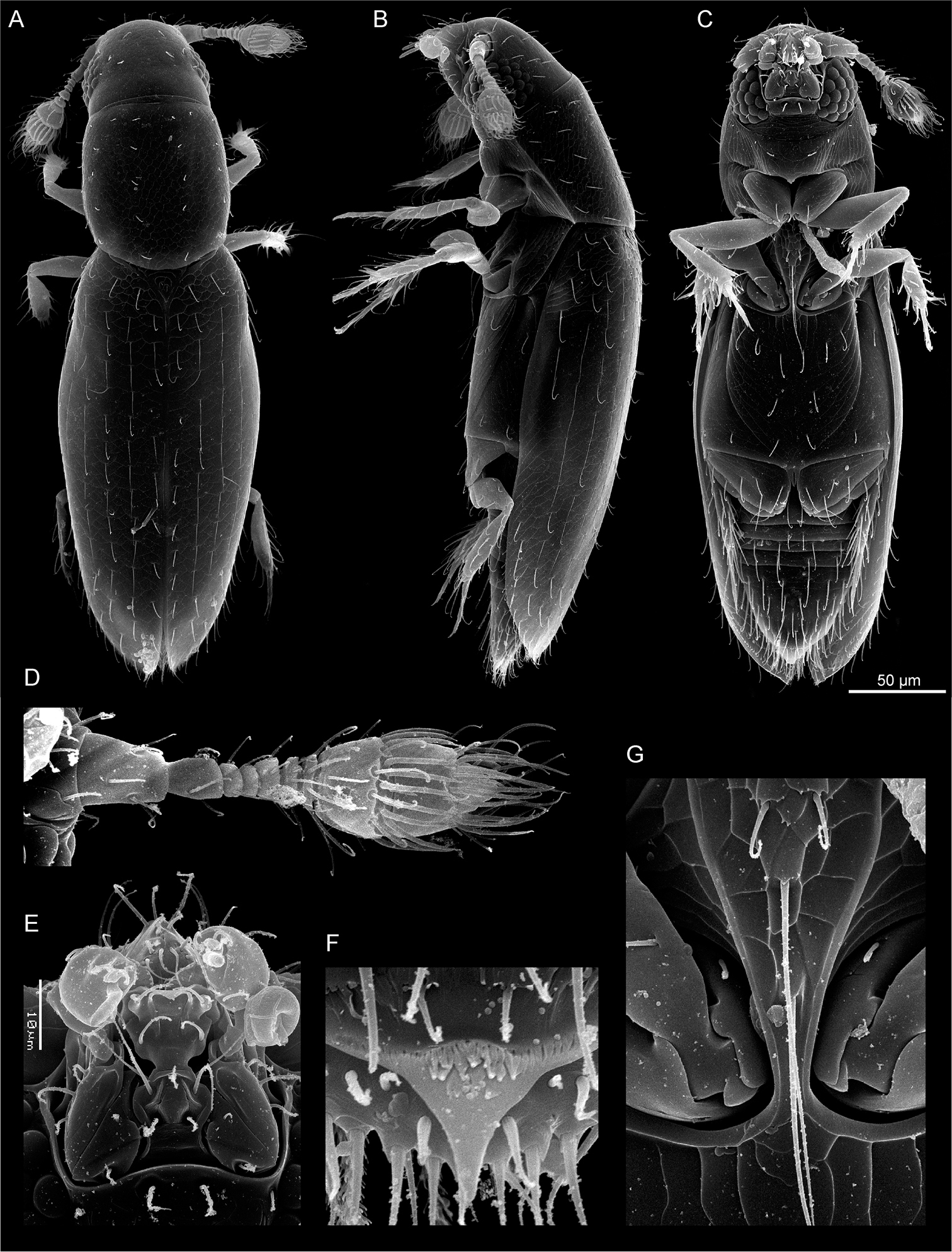
Scydosella musawasensis, the smallest known beetle: scale bar (right) is 50 μm.

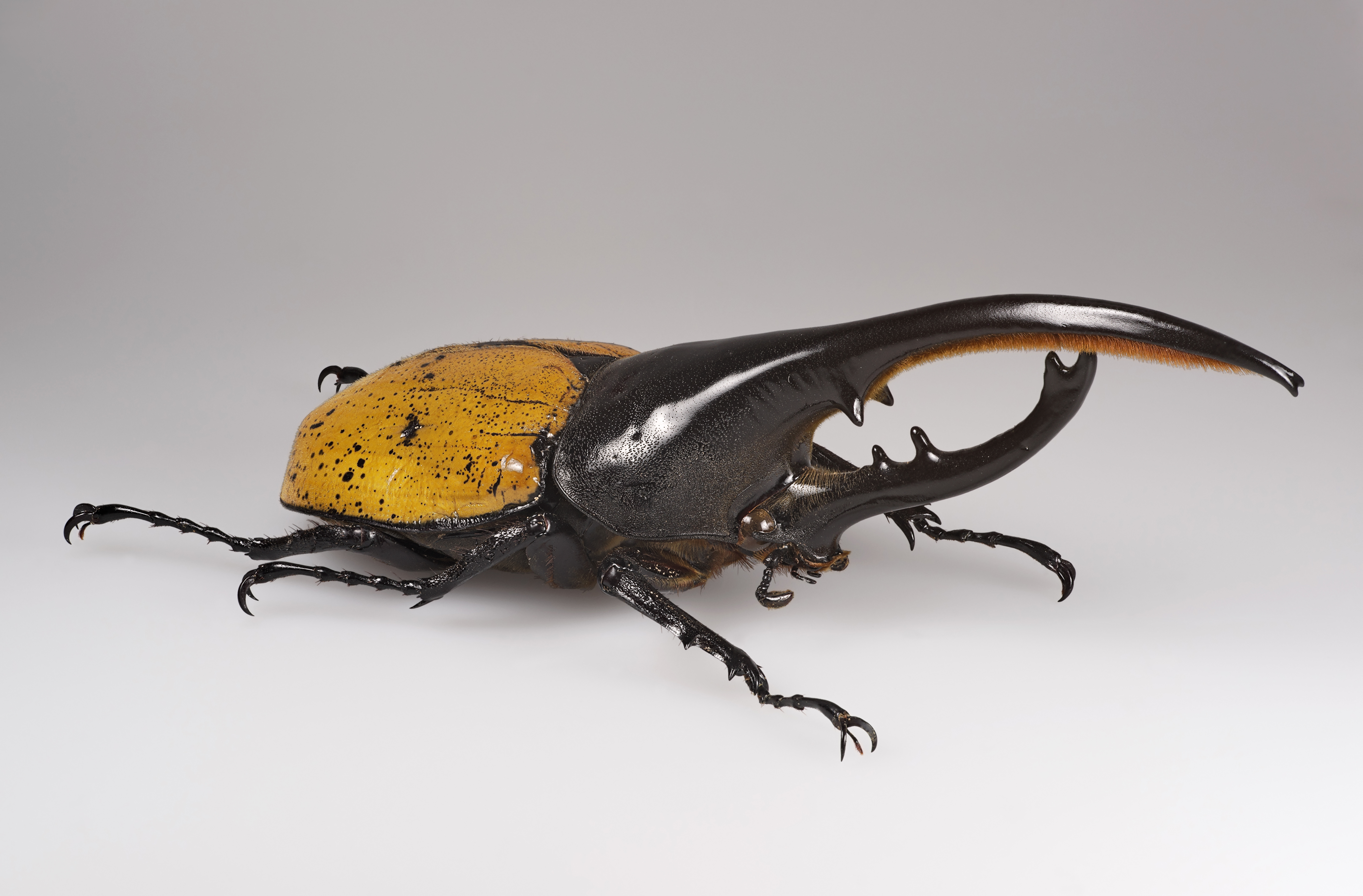
Hercules beetle, Dynastes hercules ecuatorianus, the longest of all beetles

== Evolution ==
=== Late Paleozoic and Triassic ===
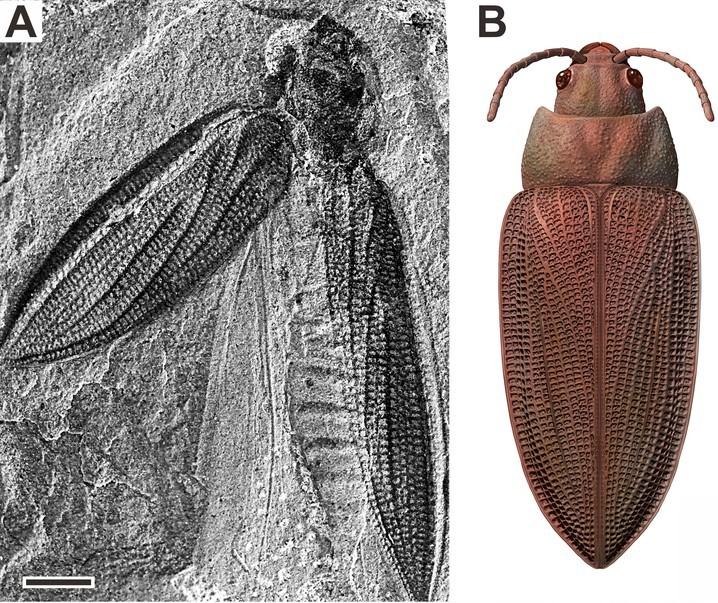
Fossil and life restoration of Moravocoleus permianus (Tshekardocoleidae) from the Early Permian of the Czech Republic, representative of the morphology of early beetles

The oldest known beetle is Coleopsis, from the earliest Permian (Asselian) of Germany, around 295 million years ago. Early beetles from the Permian, which are collectively grouped into the "Protocoleoptera" are thought to have been xylophagous (wood eating) and wood boring. Fossils from this time have been found in Siberia and Europe, for instance in the red slate fossil beds of Niedermoschel near Mainz, Germany. Further fossils have been found in Obora, Czech Republic and Tshekarda in the Ural mountains, Russia. However, there are only a few fossils from North America before the middle Permian, although both Asia and North America had been united to Euramerica. The first discoveries from North America made in the Wellington Formation of Oklahoma were published in 2005 and 2008. The earliest members of modern beetle lineages appeared during the Late Permian. In the Permian–Triassic extinction event at the end of the Permian, most "protocoleopteran" lineages became extinct. Beetle diversity did not recover to pre-extinction levels until the Middle Triassic.

=== Jurassic ===
Beetle genera were mainly detritivores in the Permian and Triassic. During the Jurassic, herbivorous and then carnivorous genera became more common. In the Cenozoic, genera at all three trophic levels became far more numerous.

During the Jurassic (210 to 145 mya), there was a dramatic increase in the diversity of beetle families, including the development and growth of carnivorous and herbivorous species. The Chrysomeloidea diversified around the same time, feeding on a wide array of plant hosts from cycads and conifers to angiosperms. Close to the Upper Jurassic, the Cupedidae decreased, but the diversity of the early plant-eating species increased. Most recent plant-eating beetles feed on flowering plants or angiosperms, whose success contributed to a doubling of plant-eating species during the Middle Jurassic. However, the increase of the number of beetle families during the Cretaceous does not correlate with the increase of the number of angiosperm species. Around the same time, numerous primitive weevils (e.g. Curculionoidea) and click beetles (e.g. Elateroidea) appeared. The first jewel beetles (e.g. Buprestidae) are present, but they remained rare until the Cretaceous.

There are more than 150 important fossil sites from the Jurassic, the majority in Eastern Europe and North Asia. Outstanding sites include Solnhofen in Upper Bavaria, Germany, Karatau in South Kazakhstan, the Yixian formation in Liaoning, North China, as well as the Jiulongshan formation and further fossil sites in Mongolia. In North America there are only a few sites with fossil records of insects from the Jurassic, namely the shell limestone deposits in the Hartford basin, the Deerfield basin and the Newark basin.

=== Cretaceous ===
The Cretaceous saw the fragmenting of the southern landmass, with the opening of the southern Atlantic Ocean and the isolation of New Zealand, while South America, Antarctica, and Australia grew more distant. The diversity of Cupedidae and Archostemata decreased considerably. Predatory ground beetles (Carabidae) and rove beetles (Staphylinidae) began to distribute into different patterns; the Carabidae predominantly occurred in the warm regions, while the Staphylinidae and click beetles (Elateridae) preferred temperate climates. Likewise, predatory species of Cleroidea and Cucujoidea hunted their prey under the bark of trees together with the jewel beetles (Buprestidae). The diversity of jewel beetles increased rapidly, as they were the primary consumers of wood, while longhorn beetles (Cerambycidae) were rather rare: their diversity increased only towards the end of the Upper Cretaceous. The first coprophagous beetles are from the Upper Cretaceous and may have lived on the excrement of herbivorous dinosaurs. The first species where both larvae and adults are adapted to an aquatic lifestyle are found. Whirligig beetles (Gyrinidae) were moderately diverse, although other early beetles (e.g. Dytiscidae) were less, with the most widespread being the species of Coptoclavidae, which preyed on aquatic fly larvae. A 2020 review of the palaeoecological interpretations of fossil beetles from Cretaceous ambers has suggested that saproxylicity was the most common feeding strategy, with fungivorous species in particular appearing to dominate.

Many fossil sites worldwide contain beetles from the Cretaceous. Most are in Europe and Asia and belong to the temperate climate zone during the Cretaceous. Lower Cretaceous sites include the Crato fossil beds in the Araripe basin in the Ceará, North Brazil, as well as overlying Santana formation; the latter was near the equator at that time. In Spain, important sites are near Montsec and Las Hoyas. In Australia, the Koonwarra fossil beds of the Korumburra group, South Gippsland, Victoria, are noteworthy. Major sites from the Upper Cretaceous include Kzyl-Dzhar in South Kazakhstan and Arkagala in Russia.

=== Cenozoic ===
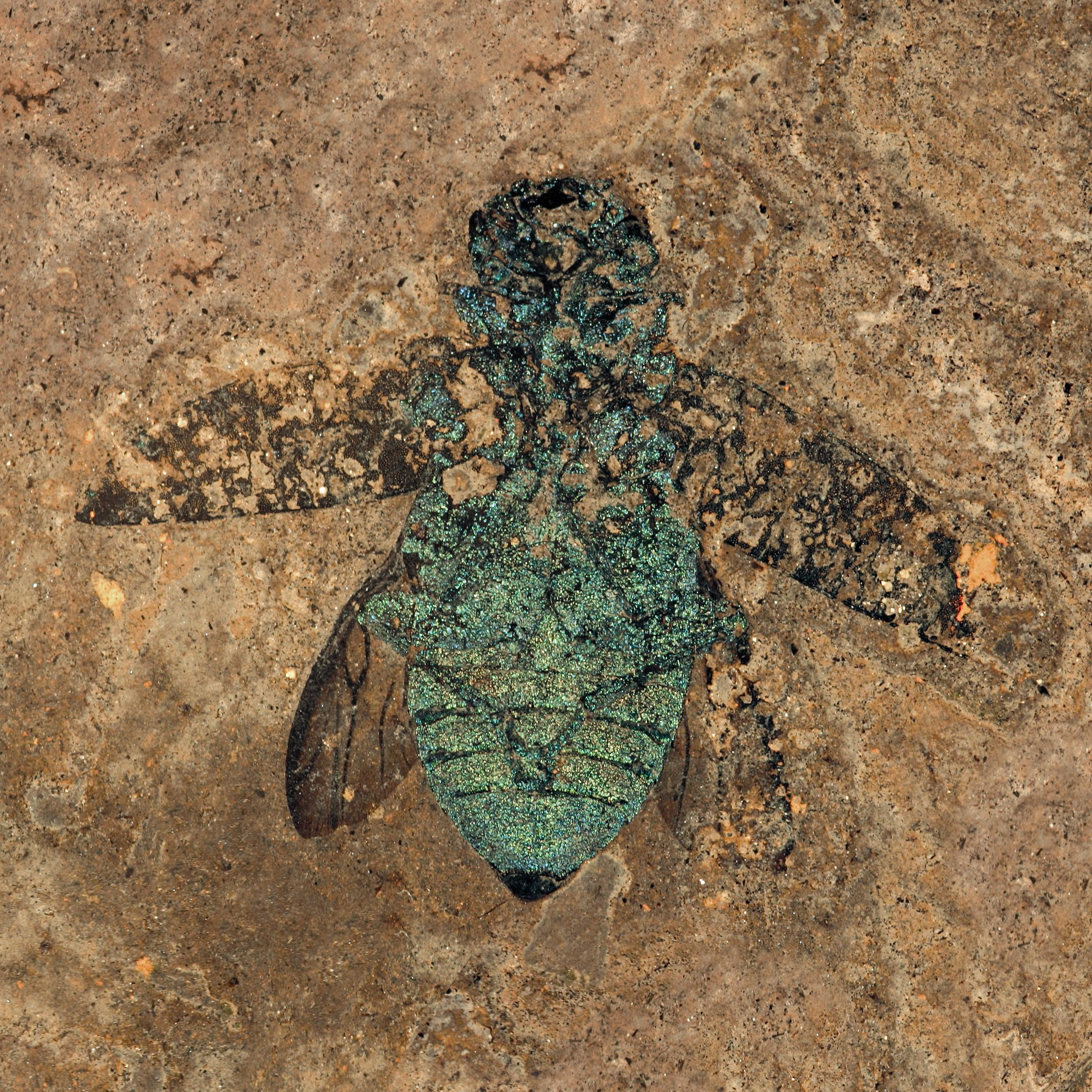
Fossil buprestid beetle from the Eocene (50 mya) Messel pit, retaining its Structural coloration

Beetle fossils are abundant in the Cenozoic; by the Quaternary (up to 1.6 mya), fossil species are identical to living ones, while from the Late Miocene (5.7 mya) the fossils are still so close to modern forms that they are most likely the ancestors of living species. The large oscillations in climate during the Quaternary caused beetles to change their geographic distributions so much that current location gives little clue to the biogeographical history of a species. It is evident that geographic isolation of populations must often have been broken as insects moved under the influence of changing climate, causing mixing of gene pools, rapid evolution, and extinctions, especially in middle latitudes.

== Phylogeny ==
The very large number of beetle species poses special problems for classification. Some families contain tens of thousands of species, and need to be divided into subfamilies and tribes. Polyphaga is the largest suborder, containing more than 300,000 described species in more than 170 families, including rove beetles (Staphylinidae), scarab beetles (Scarabaeidae), blister beetles (Meloidae), stag beetles (Lucanidae) and true weevils (Curculionidae). These polyphagan beetle groups can be identified by the presence of cervical sclerites (hardened parts of the head used as points of attachment for muscles) absent in the other suborders. Adephaga contains about 10 families of largely predatory beetles, includes ground beetles (Carabidae), water beetles (Dytiscidae) and whirligig beetles (Gyrinidae). In these insects, the testes are tubular and the first abdominal sternum (a plate of the exoskeleton) is divided by the hind coxae (the basal joints of the beetle's legs). Archostemata contains four families of mainly wood-eating beetles, including reticulated beetles (Cupedidae) and the telephone-pole beetle. The Archostemata have an exposed plate called the metatrochantin in front of the basal segment or coxa of the hind leg. Myxophaga contains about 65 described species in four families, mostly very small, including Hydroscaphidae and the genus Sphaerius. The myxophagan beetles are small and mostly alga-feeders. Their mouthparts are characteristic in lacking galeae and having a mobile tooth on their left mandible.

The consistency of beetle morphology, in particular their possession of elytra, has long suggested that Coleoptera is monophyletic, though there have been doubts about the arrangement of the suborders, namely the Adephaga, Archostemata, Myxophaga and Polyphaga within that clade. The twisted-wing parasites, Strepsiptera, are thought to be a sister group to the beetles, having split from them in the Early Permian.

Molecular phylogenetic analysis confirms that the Coleoptera are monophyletic. Duane McKenna et al. (2015) used eight nuclear genes for 367 species from 172 of 183 Coleopteran families. They split the Adephaga into 2 clades, Hydradephaga and Geadephaga, broke up the Cucujoidea into 3 clades, and placed the Lymexyloidea within the Tenebrionoidea. The Polyphaga appear to date from the Triassic. Most extant beetle families appear to have arisen in the Cretaceous. The cladogram is based on McKenna (2015). The number of species in each group (mainly superfamilies) is shown in parentheses, and boldface if over 10,000. English common names are given where possible. Dates of origin of major groups are shown in italics in millions of years ago (mya).

- **Coleoptera** 285 mya
  - - 240 mya
      - 160 mya
        Archostemata (40)
      - 220 mya
        Myxophaga (94)
    - Adephaga 200 mya
      - Hydradephaga (5,560) e.g. Dytiscidae (diving beetles)
      - Geadephaga (**35,000**) e.g. Carabidae (ground beetles)
  - Polyphaga 225 mya
    - 200 mya
      Scirtoidea (800) + Derodontoidea (29)
    - - - 195 mya
          Staphylinoidea (**48,000**, rove beetles and allies)
        - - 145 mya
            Scarabaeoidea (**35,000**, scarabs, stag beetles, etc.)
          - - Hydrophiloidea (2,800, water scavenger beetles)
            - Histeroidea (3,800, clown beetles)
      - - Elateriformia 190 mya
          - Nosodendridae (70)
          - - Dascilloidea (180)
            - - Buprestoidea (**14,000**, jewel beetles)
              - - Byrrhoidea (400, pill and turtle beetles, etc.)
                - Elateroidea (**23,000**, click and soldier beetles, fireflies)
        - 190 mya
          - - Bostrichoidea (3150, deathwatch, powderpost and skin beetles)
            - Cucujiformia
              - Coccinelloidea (6,000, ladybirds or lady beetles)
              - - 180 mya
                  Tenebrionoidea (**35,000**, leaf/flower beetles, etc.) and Lymexyloidea
                - - Cleroidea (9,900, checkered beetles and allies)
                  - - Cucujoidea (8,000)
                    - Phytophaga 170 mya
                      - Chrysomeloidea
                        - Chrysomelidae (**35,000**, leaf beetles)
                        - Cerambycidae (**25,000**, longhorn beetles)
                      - Curculionoidea (**97,000**, weevils)

== External morphology ==
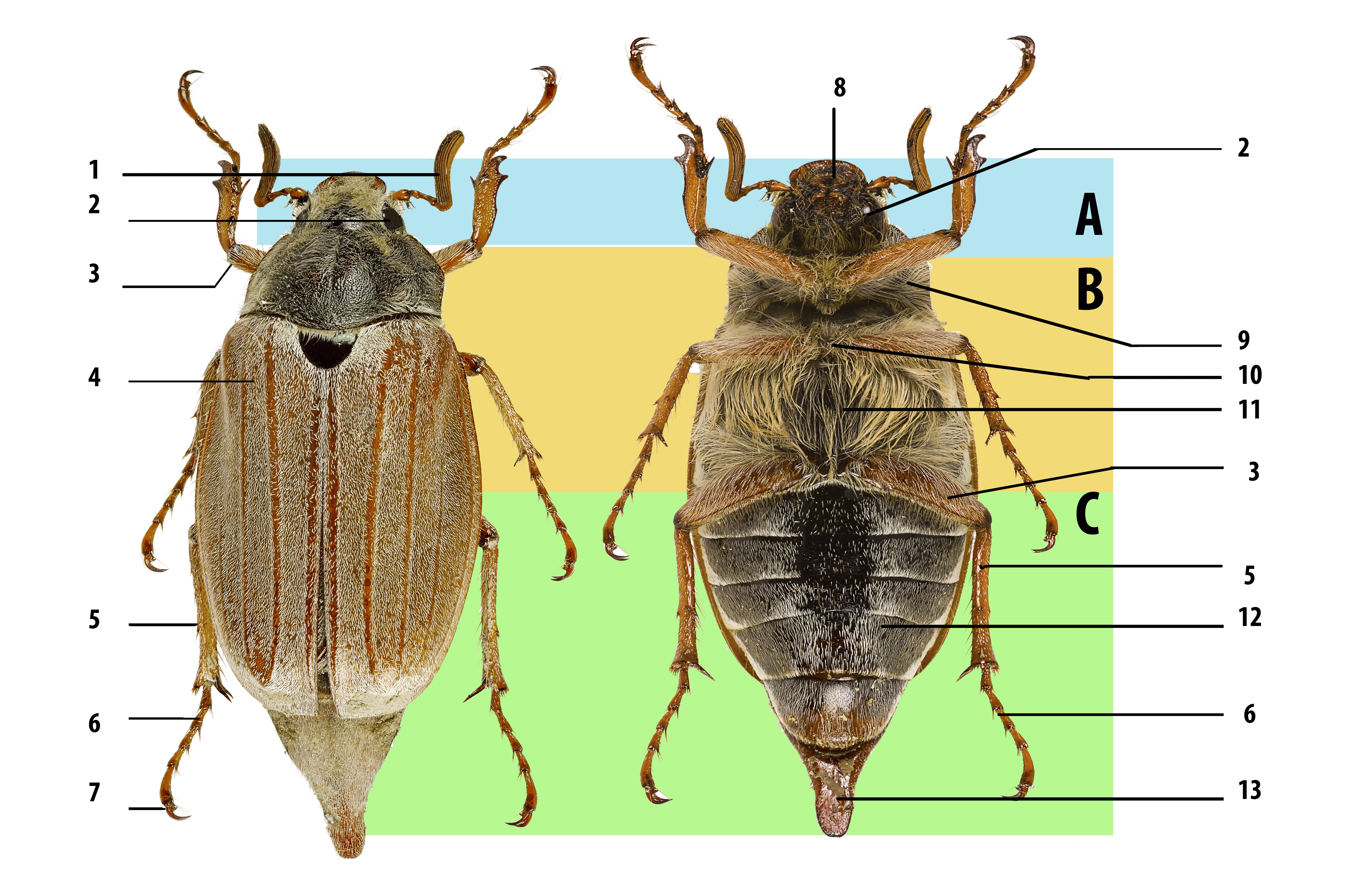
Beetle body structure, using cockchafer. A: head, B: thorax, C: abdomen. 1: antenna, 2: compound eye, 3: femur, 4: elytron (wing cover), 5: tibia, 6: tarsus, 7: claws, 8: mouthparts, 9: prothorax, 10: mesothorax, 11: metathorax, 12: abdominal sternites, 13: pygidium.

Beetles are generally characterized by a particularly hard exoskeleton and hard forewings (elytra) not usable for flying. Almost all beetles have mandibles that move in a horizontal plane. The mouthparts are rarely suctorial, though they are sometimes reduced; the maxillae always bear palps. The antennae usually have 11 or fewer segments, except in some groups like the Cerambycidae (longhorn beetles) and the Rhipiceridae (cicada parasite beetles). The coxae of the legs are usually located recessed within a coxal cavity. The genitalic structures are telescoped into the last abdominal segment in all extant beetles. Beetle larvae can often be confused with those of other holometabolan groups. The beetle's exoskeleton is made up of numerous plates, called sclerites, separated by thin sutures. This design provides armored defenses while maintaining flexibility. The general anatomy of a beetle is quite uniform, although specific organs and appendages vary greatly in appearance and function between the many families in the order. Like all insects, beetles' bodies are divided into three sections: the head, the thorax, and the abdomen. Because there are so many species, identification is quite difficult, and relies on attributes including the shape of the antennae, the tarsal formulae (Note: These count fore, mid, and hind leg tarsal segments, such as 5-5-4.) and shapes of these small segments on the legs, the mouthparts, and the ventral plates (sterna, pleura, coxae). In many species accurate identification can only be made by examination of the unique male genitalic structures.

=== Head ===
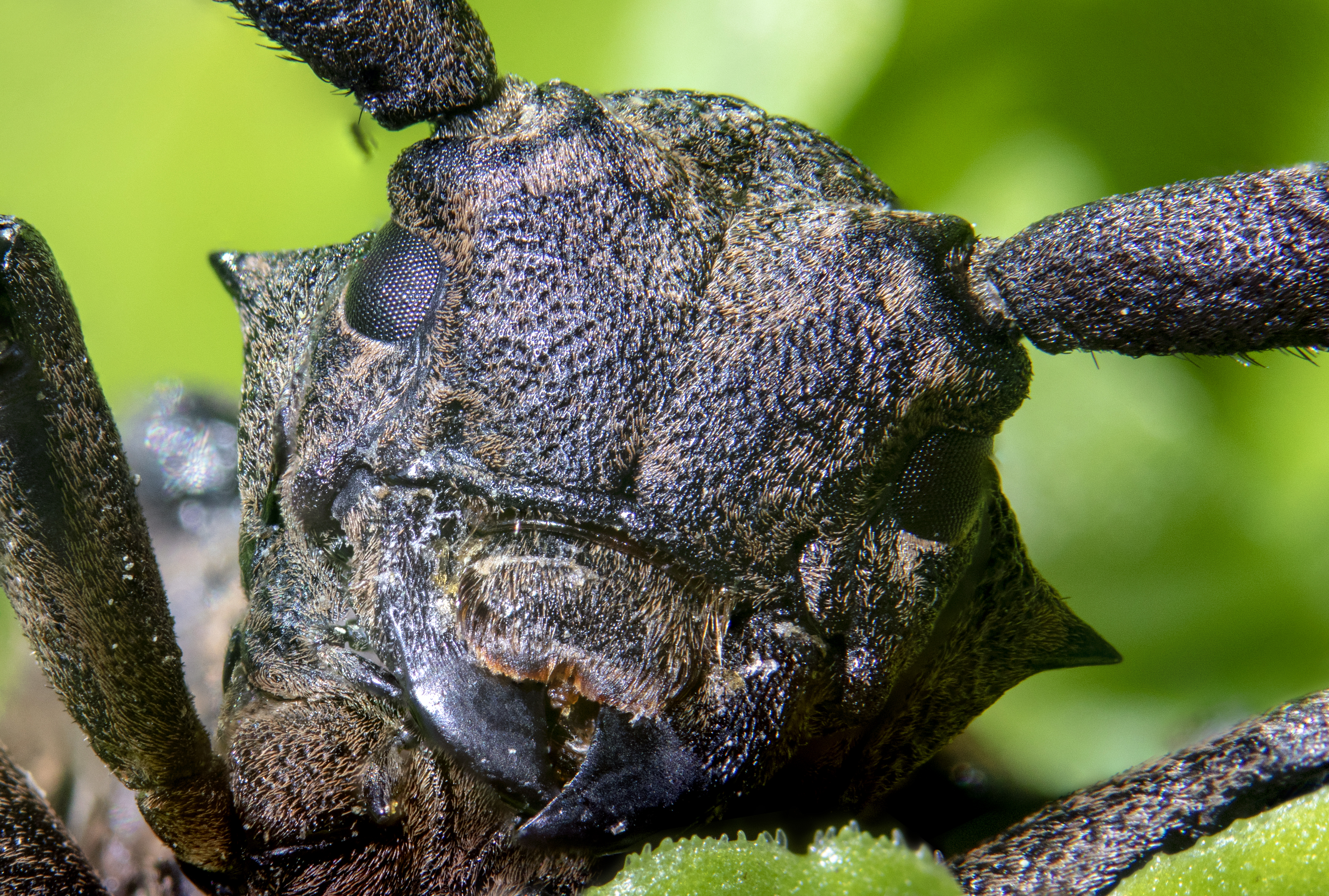
Front view of the head of Lamia textor

The head, having mouthparts projecting forward or sometimes downturned, is usually heavily sclerotized and is sometimes very large. The eyes are compound and may display remarkable adaptability, as in the case of the aquatic whirligig beetles (Gyrinidae), where they are split to allow a view both above and below the waterline. A few longhorn beetles (Cerambycidae) and weevils as well as some fireflies (Rhagophthalmidae) have divided eyes, while many have eyes that are notched, and a few have ocelli, small, simple eyes usually farther back on the head (on the vertex); these are more common in larvae than in adults. The anatomical organization of the compound eyes may be modified and depends on whether a species is primarily crepuscular, or diurnally or nocturnally active. Ocelli are found in the adult carpet beetle (as a single central ocellus in Dermestidae), some rove beetles (Omaliinae), and the Derodontidae.

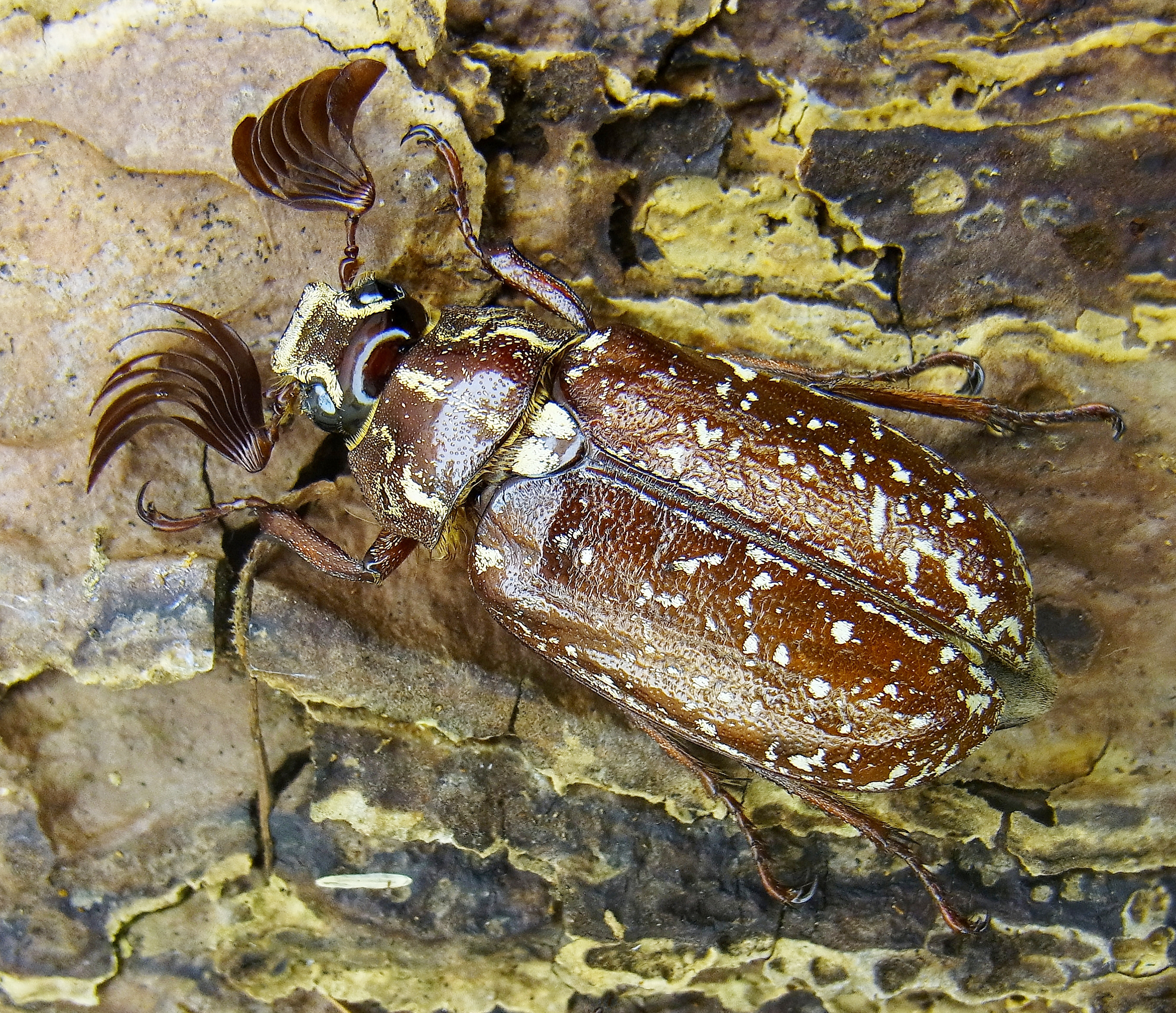
Polyphylla fullo has distinctive fan-like antennae, one of several distinct forms for the appendages among beetles.

Beetle antennae are primarily organs of sensory perception and can detect motion, odor and chemical substances, but may also be used to physically feel a beetle's environment. Beetle families may use antennae in different ways. For example, when moving quickly, tiger beetles may not be able to see very well and instead hold their antennae rigidly in front of them in order to avoid obstacles. Certain Cerambycidae use antennae to balance, and blister beetles may use them for grasping. Some aquatic beetle species may use antennae for gathering air and passing it under the body whilst submerged. Equally, some families use antennae during mating, and a few species use them for defense. In the cerambycid Onychocerus albitarsis, the antennae have venom injecting structures used in defense, which is unique among arthropods. Antennae vary greatly in form, sometimes between the sexes, but are often similar within any given family. Antennae may be clubbed, threadlike, angled, shaped like a string of beads, comb-like (either on one side or both, bipectinate), or toothed. The physical variation of antennae is important for the identification of many beetle groups. The Curculionidae have elbowed or geniculate antennae. Feather like flabellate antennae are a restricted form found in the Rhipiceridae and a few other families. The Silphidae have a capitate antennae with a spherical head at the tip. The Scarabaeidae typically have lamellate antennae with the terminal segments extended into long flat structures stacked together. The Carabidae typically have thread-like antennae. The antennae arises between the eye and the mandibles and in the Tenebrionidae, the antennae rise in front of a notch that breaks the usually circular outline of the compound eye. They are segmented and usually consist of 11 parts, the first part is called the scape and the second part is the pedicel. The other segments are jointly called the flagellum.

Beetles have mouthparts like those of grasshoppers. The mandibles appear as large pincers on the front of some beetles. The mandibles are a pair of hard, often tooth-like structures that move horizontally to grasp, crush, or cut food or enemies (see defence, below). Two pairs of finger-like appendages, the maxillary and labial palpi, are found around the mouth in most beetles, serving to move food into the mouth. In many species, the mandibles are sexually dimorphic, with those of the males enlarged enormously compared with those of females of the same species.

=== Thorax ===
The thorax is segmented into the two discernible parts, the pro- and pterothorax. The pterothorax is the fused meso- and metathorax, which are commonly separated in other insect species, although flexibly articulate from the prothorax. When viewed from below, the thorax is that part from which all three pairs of legs and both pairs of wings arise. The abdomen is everything posterior to the thorax. When viewed from above, most beetles appear to have three clear sections, but this is deceptive: on the beetle's upper surface, the middle section is a hard plate called the pronotum, which is only the front part of the thorax; the back part of the thorax is concealed by the beetle's wings.

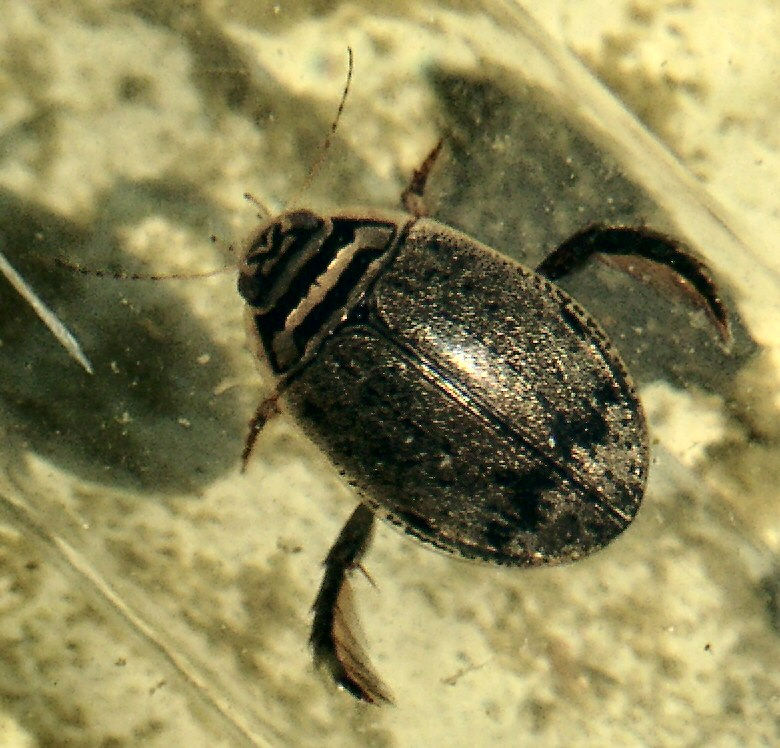
Acilius sulcatus, a diving beetle with hind legs adapted as swimming limbs

=== Legs ===
The multisegmented legs end in two to five small segments called tarsi. Like many other insect orders, beetles have claws, usually one pair, on the end of the last tarsal segment of each leg. While most beetles use their legs for walking, legs have been variously adapted for other uses. Aquatic beetles including the Dytiscidae (diving beetles), Haliplidae, and many species of Hydrophilidae, the legs, often the last pair, are modified for swimming, typically with rows of long hairs. Male diving beetles have suctorial cups on their forelegs that they use to grasp females. Other beetles have fossorial legs widened and often spined for digging. Species with such adaptations are found among the scarabs, ground beetles, and clown beetles (Histeridae). The hind legs of some beetles, such as flea beetles (within Chrysomelidae) and flea weevils (within Curculionidae), have enlarged femurs that help them leap.

=== Wings ===
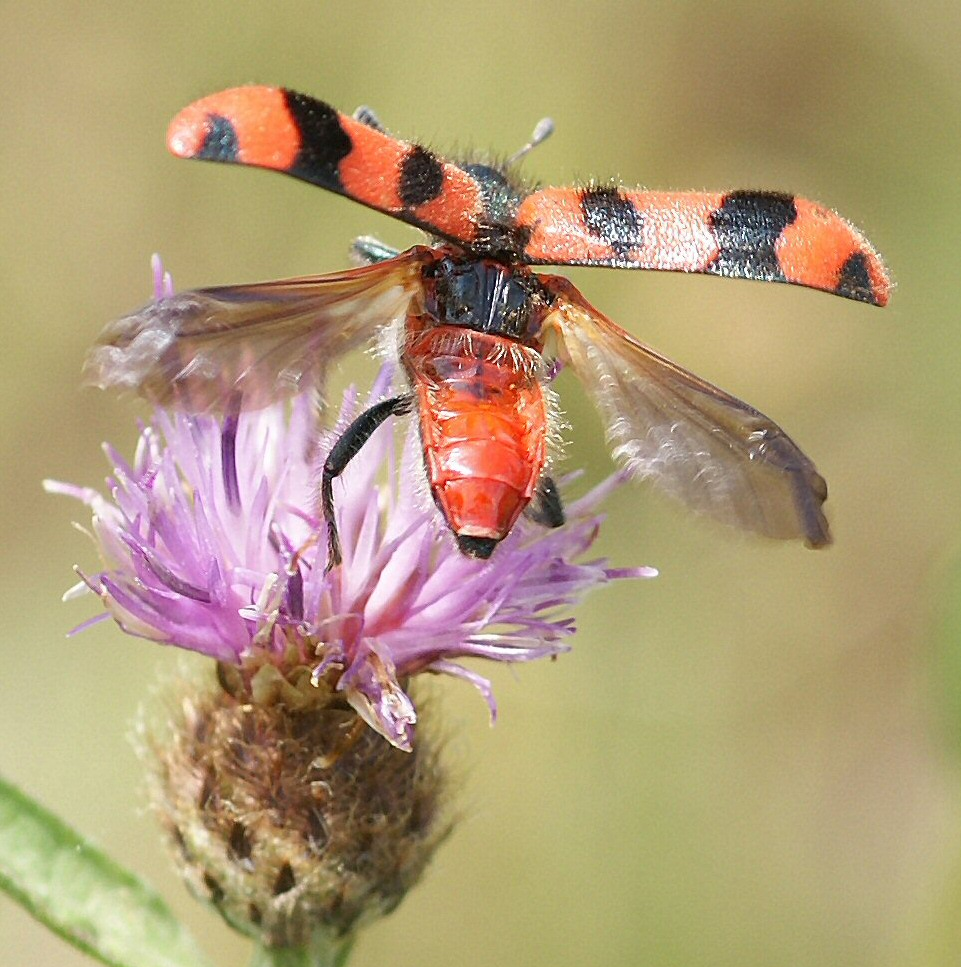
Checkered beetle Trichodes alvearius taking off, showing the hard elytra (forewings adapted as wing-cases) held stiffly away from the flight wings

The forewings of beetles are not used for flight, but form elytra which cover the hind part of the body and protect the hindwings. The elytra are usually hard shell-like structures which must be raised to allow the hindwings to move for flight. However, in the soldier beetles (Cantharidae), the elytra are soft, earning this family the name of leatherwings. Other soft wing beetles include the net-winged beetle Calopteron discrepans, which has brittle wings that rupture easily in order to release chemicals for defense.

Beetles' flight wings are crossed with veins and are folded after landing, often along these veins, and stored below the elytra. A fold (jugum) of the membrane at the base of each wing is characteristic. Some beetles have lost the ability to fly. These include some ground beetles (Carabidae) and some true weevils (Curculionidae), as well as desert- and cave-dwelling species of other families. Many have the two elytra fused together, forming a solid shield over the abdomen. In a few families, both the ability to fly and the elytra have been lost, as in the glow-worms (Phengodidae), where the females resemble larvae throughout their lives. The presence of elytra and wings does not always indicate that the beetle will fly. For example, the tansy beetle walks between habitats despite being physically capable of flight.

=== Abdomen ===
The abdomen is the section behind the metathorax, made up of a series of rings, each with a hole for breathing and respiration, called a spiracle, composing three different segmented sclerites: the tergum, pleura, and the sternum. The tergum in almost all species is membranous, or usually soft and concealed by the wings and elytra when not in flight. The pleura are usually small or hidden in some species, with each pleuron having a single spiracle. The sternum is the most widely visible part of the abdomen, being a more or less sclerotized segment. The abdomen itself does not have any appendages, but some (for example, Mordellidae) have articulating sternal lobes.

== Anatomy and physiology ==
A beetle's body systems

=== Digestive system ===
The digestive system of beetles is primarily adapted for a herbivorous diet. Digestion takes place mostly in the anterior midgut, although in predatory groups like the Carabidae, most digestion occurs in the crop by means of midgut enzymes. In the Elateridae, the larvae are liquid feeders that extraorally digest their food by secreting enzymes. The alimentary canal basically consists of a short, narrow pharynx, a widened expansion, the crop, and a poorly developed gizzard. This is followed by the midgut, that varies in dimensions between species, with a large amount of cecum, and the hindgut, with varying lengths. There are typically four to six Malpighian tubules.

=== Nervous system ===
The nervous system in beetles contains all the types found in insects, varying between different species, from three thoracic and seven or eight abdominal ganglia which can be distinguished to that in which all the thoracic and abdominal ganglia are fused to form a composite structure.

=== Respiratory system ===
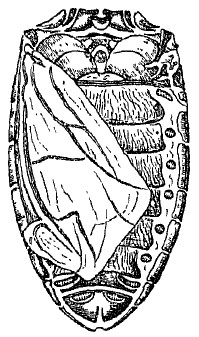
Dytiscus spiracles (right) on upper side of abdomen, normally covered by the elytra, are in contact with an air bubble when the beetle dives.

Like most insects, beetles inhale air, for the oxygen it contains, and exhale carbon dioxide, via a tracheal system. Air enters the body through spiracles, and circulates within the haemocoel in a system of tracheae and tracheoles, through whose walls the gases can diffuse.

Diving beetles, such as the Dytiscidae, carry a bubble of air with them when they dive. Such a bubble may be contained under the elytra or against the body by specialized hydrophobic hairs. The bubble covers at least some of the spiracles, permitting air to enter the tracheae. The function of the bubble is not only to contain a store of air but to act as a physical gill. The air that it traps is in contact with oxygenated water, so as the animal's consumption depletes the oxygen in the bubble, more oxygen can diffuse in to replenish it. Carbon dioxide is more soluble in water than either oxygen or nitrogen, so it readily diffuses out faster than in. Nitrogen is the most plentiful gas in the bubble, and the least soluble, so it constitutes a relatively static component of the bubble and acts as a stable medium for respiratory gases to accumulate in and pass through. Occasional visits to the surface are sufficient for the beetle to re-establish the constitution of the bubble.

=== Circulatory system ===
Like other insects, beetles have open circulatory systems, based on hemolymph rather than blood. As in other insects, a segmented tube-like heart is attached to the dorsal wall of the hemocoel. It has paired inlets or ostia at intervals down its length, and circulates the hemolymph from the main cavity of the haemocoel and out through the anterior cavity in the head.

=== Specialized organs ===
Different glands are specialized for different pheromones to attract mates. Pheromones from species of Rutelinae are produced from epithelial cells lining the inner surface of the apical abdominal segments; amino acid-based pheromones of Melolonthinae are produced from eversible glands on the abdominal apex. Other species produce different types of pheromones. Dermestids produce esters, and species of Elateridae produce fatty acid-derived aldehydes and acetates. To attract a mate, fireflies (Lampyridae) use modified fat body cells with transparent surfaces backed with reflective uric acid crystals to produce light by bioluminescence. Light production is highly efficient, by oxidation of luciferin catalyzed by enzymes (luciferases) in the presence of adenosine triphosphate (ATP) and oxygen, producing oxyluciferin, carbon dioxide, and light.

Tympanal organs or hearing organs consist of a membrane (tympanum) stretched across a frame backed by an air sac and associated sensory neurons, are found in two families. Several species of the genus Cicindela (Carabidae) have hearing organs on the dorsal surfaces of their first abdominal segments beneath the wings; two tribes in the Dynastinae (within the Scarabaeidae) have hearing organs just beneath their pronotal shields or neck membranes. Both families are sensitive to ultrasonic frequencies, with strong evidence indicating they function to detect the presence of bats by their ultrasonic echolocation.

== Reproduction and development ==
Beetles are members of the superorder Holometabola, and accordingly most of them undergo complete metamorphosis. The typical form of metamorphosis in beetles passes through four main stages: the egg, the larva, the pupa, and the imago or adult. The larvae are commonly called grubs and the pupa sometimes is called the chrysalis. In some species, the pupa may be enclosed in a cocoon constructed by the larva towards the end of its final instar. Some beetles, such as typical members of the families Meloidae and Rhipiphoridae, go further, undergoing hypermetamorphosis in which the first instar takes the form of a triungulin.

=== Mating ===
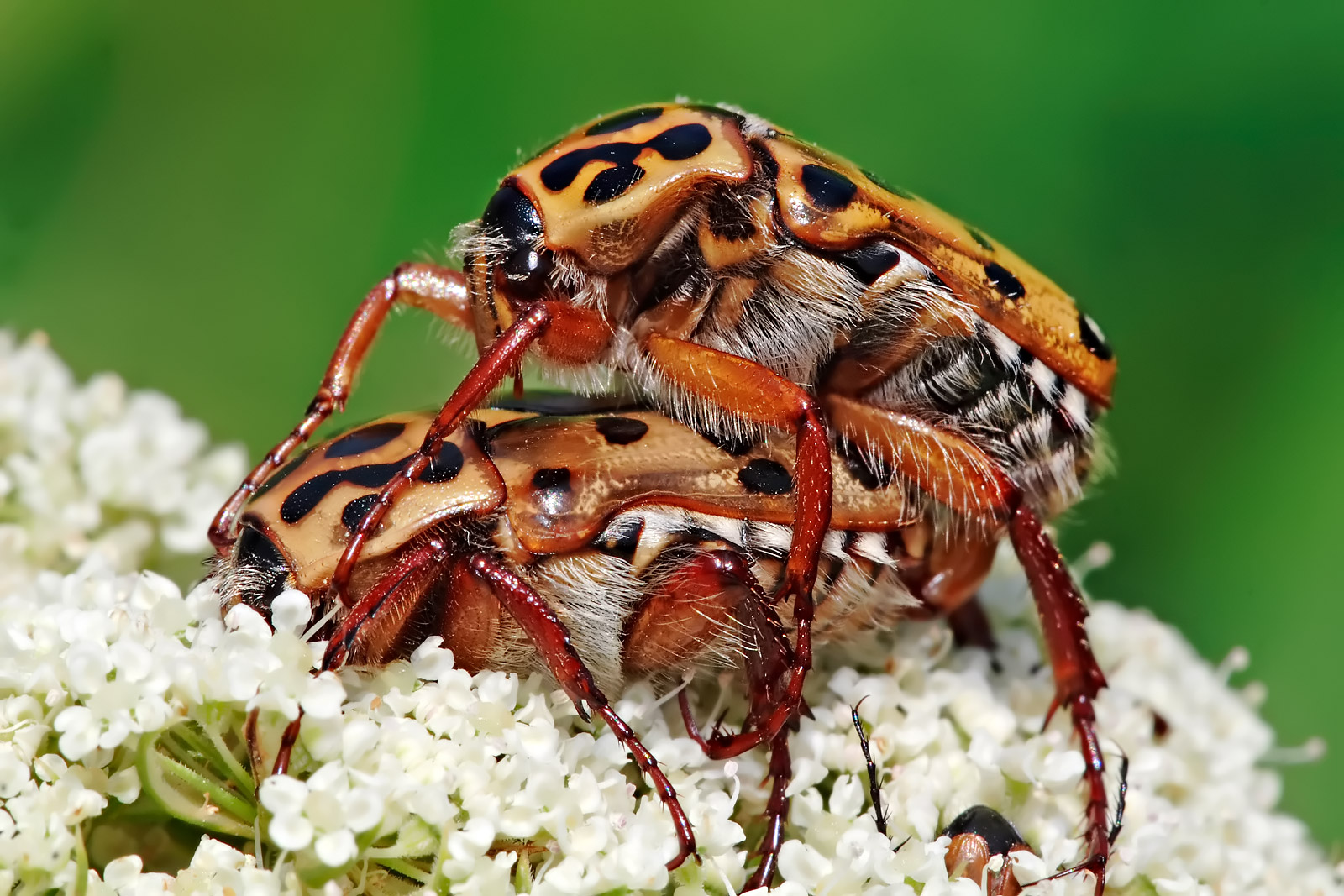
Punctate flower chafers (Neorrhina punctata, Scarabaeidae) mating

Some beetles have intricate mating behaviour. Pheromone communication is often important in locating a mate. Different species use different pheromones. Scarab beetles such as the Rutelinae use pheromones derived from fatty acid synthesis and others use pheromones from organic compounds, while other scarabs such as the Melolonthinae use amino acids and terpenoids. Another way beetles find mates is seen in the fireflies (Lampyridae) which are bioluminescent, with abdominal light-producing organs. The males and females engage in a complex dialog before mating; each species has a unique combination of flight patterns, duration, composition, and intensity of the light produced.

Before mating, males and females may stridulate, or vibrate the objects they are on. In the Meloidae, the male climbs onto the dorsum of the female and strokes his antennae on her head, palps, and antennae. In Eupompha, the male draws his antennae along his longitudinal vertex. They may not mate at all if they do not perform the precopulatory ritual. This mating behavior may be different amongst dispersed populations of the same species. For example, the mating of a Russian population of tansy beetle (Chrysolina graminis) is preceded by an elaborate ritual involving the male tapping the female's eyes, pronotum and antennae with its antennae, which is not evident in the population of this species in the United Kingdom.

In another example, the intromittent organ of male thistle tortoise beetles is a long, tube-like structure called the flagellum which is thin and curved. When not in use, the flagellum is stored inside the abdomen of the male and can extend out to be longer than the male when needed. During mating, this organ bends to the complex shape of the female reproductive organ, which includes a coiled duct that the male must penetrate with the organ. Furthermore, these physical properties of the thistle tortoise beetle have been studied because the ability of a thin, flexible structure to harden without buckling or rupturing is mechanically challenging and may have important implications for the development of microscopic catheters in modern medicine.

Competition can play a part in the mating rituals of species such as burying beetles (Nicrophorus), the insects fighting to determine which can mate. Many male beetles are territorial and fiercely defend their territories from intruding males. In such species, the male often has horns on the head or thorax, making its body length greater than that of a female. Copulation is generally quick, but in some cases lasts for several hours. During copulation, sperm cells are transferred to the female to fertilize the egg.

=== Life cycle ===
The life cycle of the stag beetle has three larval instars.

==== Egg ====
Essentially all beetles lay eggs, though some myrmecophilous Aleocharinae and some Chrysomelinae which live in mountains or the subarctic are ovoviviparous, laying eggs which hatch almost immediately. Beetle eggs generally have smooth surfaces and are soft, though the Cupedidae have hard eggs. Eggs vary widely between species: the eggs tend to be small in species with many instars (larval stages), and in those that lay large numbers of eggs. A female may lay from several dozen to several thousand eggs during her lifetime, depending on the extent of parental care. This ranges from the simple laying of eggs under a leaf, to the parental care provided by scarab beetles, which house, feed and protect their young. The Attelabidae roll leaves and lay their eggs inside the roll for protection.

==== Larva ====
The larva is usually the principal feeding stage of the beetle life cycle. Larvae tend to feed voraciously once they emerge from their eggs. Some feed externally on plants, such as those of certain leaf beetles, while others feed within their food sources. Examples of internal feeders are most Buprestidae and longhorn beetles. The larvae of many beetle families are predatory like the adults (ground beetles, ladybirds, rove beetles). The larval period varies between species, but can be as long as several years. The larvae of skin beetles undergo a degree of reversed development when starved, and later grow back to the previously attained level of maturity. The cycle can be repeated many times (see Biological immortality). Larval morphology is highly varied amongst species, with well-developed and sclerotized heads, distinguishable thoracic and abdominal segments (usually the tenth, though sometimes the eighth or ninth).

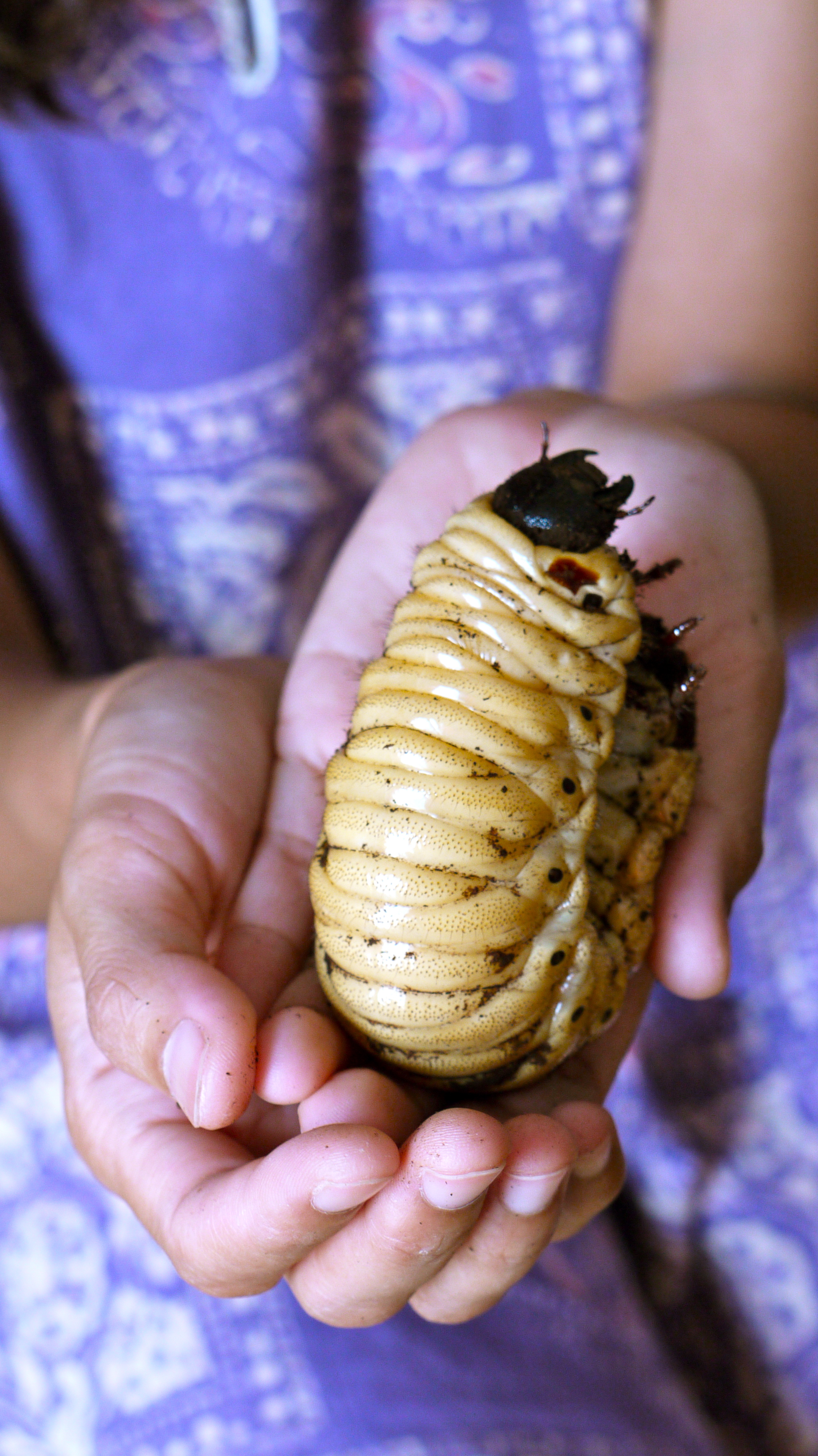
Scarabaeiform larva of Hercules beetle

Beetle larvae can be differentiated from other insect larvae by their hardened, often darkened heads, the presence of chewing mouthparts, and spiracles along the sides of their bodies. Like adult beetles, the larvae are varied in appearance, particularly between beetle families. Beetles with somewhat flattened, highly mobile larvae include the ground beetles and rove beetles; their larvae are described as campodeiform. Some beetle larvae resemble hardened worms with dark head capsules and minute legs. These are elateriform larvae, and are found in the click beetle (Elateridae) and darkling beetle (Tenebrionidae) families. Some elateriform larvae of click beetles are known as wireworms. Beetles in the Scarabaeoidea have short, thick larvae described as scarabaeiform, more commonly known as grubs.

All beetle larvae go through several instars, which are the developmental stages between each moult. In many species, the larvae simply increase in size with each successive instar as more food is consumed. In some cases, however, more dramatic changes occur. Among certain beetle families or genera, particularly those that exhibit parasitic lifestyles, the first instar (the planidium) is highly mobile to search out a host, while the following instars are more sedentary and remain on or within their host. This is known as hypermetamorphosis; it occurs in the Meloidae, Micromalthidae, and Ripiphoridae. The blister beetle Epicauta vittata (Meloidae), for example, has three distinct larval stages. Its first stage, the triungulin, has longer legs to go in search of the eggs of grasshoppers. After feeding for a week it moults to the second stage, called the caraboid stage, which resembles the larva of a carabid beetle. In another week it moults and assumes the appearance of a scarabaeid larva—the scarabaeidoid stage. Its penultimate larval stage is the pseudo-pupa or the coarcate larva, which will overwinter and pupate until the next spring.

The larval period can vary widely. A fungus feeding staphylinid Phanerota fasciata undergoes three moults in 3.2 days at room temperature while Anisotoma sp. (Leiodidae) completes its larval stage in the fruiting body of slime mold in 2 days and possibly represents the fastest growing beetles. Dermestid beetles, Trogoderma inclusum can remain in an extended larval state under unfavourable conditions, even reducing their size between moults. A larva is reported to have survived for 3.5 years in an enclosed container.

==== Pupa and adult ====
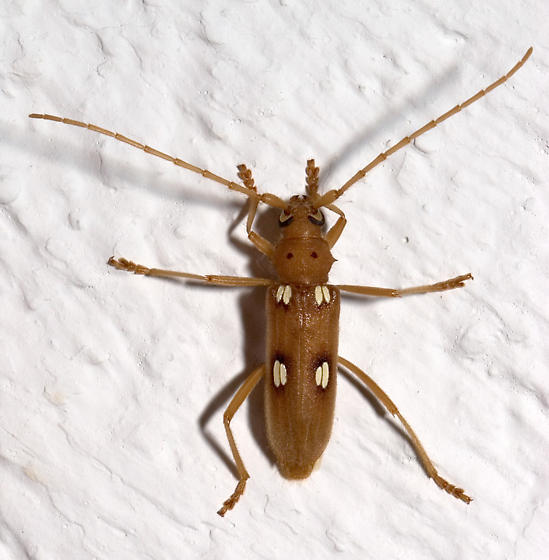
The ivory-marked beetle, Eburia quadrigeminata, may live up to 40 years inside the hardwoods on which the larva feeds.

As with all holometabolans, beetle larvae pupate, and from these pupae emerge fully formed, sexually mature adult beetles, or imagos. Pupae never have mandibles (they are adecticous). In most pupae, the appendages are not attached to the body and are said to be exarate; in a few beetles (Staphylinidae, Ptiliidae etc.) the appendages are fused with the body (termed as obtect pupae).

Adults have extremely variable lifespans, from weeks to years, depending on the species. Some wood-boring beetles can have extremely long life-cycles. It is believed that when furniture or house timbers are infested by beetle larvae, the timber already contained the larvae when it was first sawn up. A birch bookcase 40 years old released adult Eburia quadrigeminata (Cerambycidae), while Buprestis aurulenta and other Buprestidae have been documented as emerging as much as 51 years after manufacture of wooden items.

== Behaviour ==
=== Locomotion ===
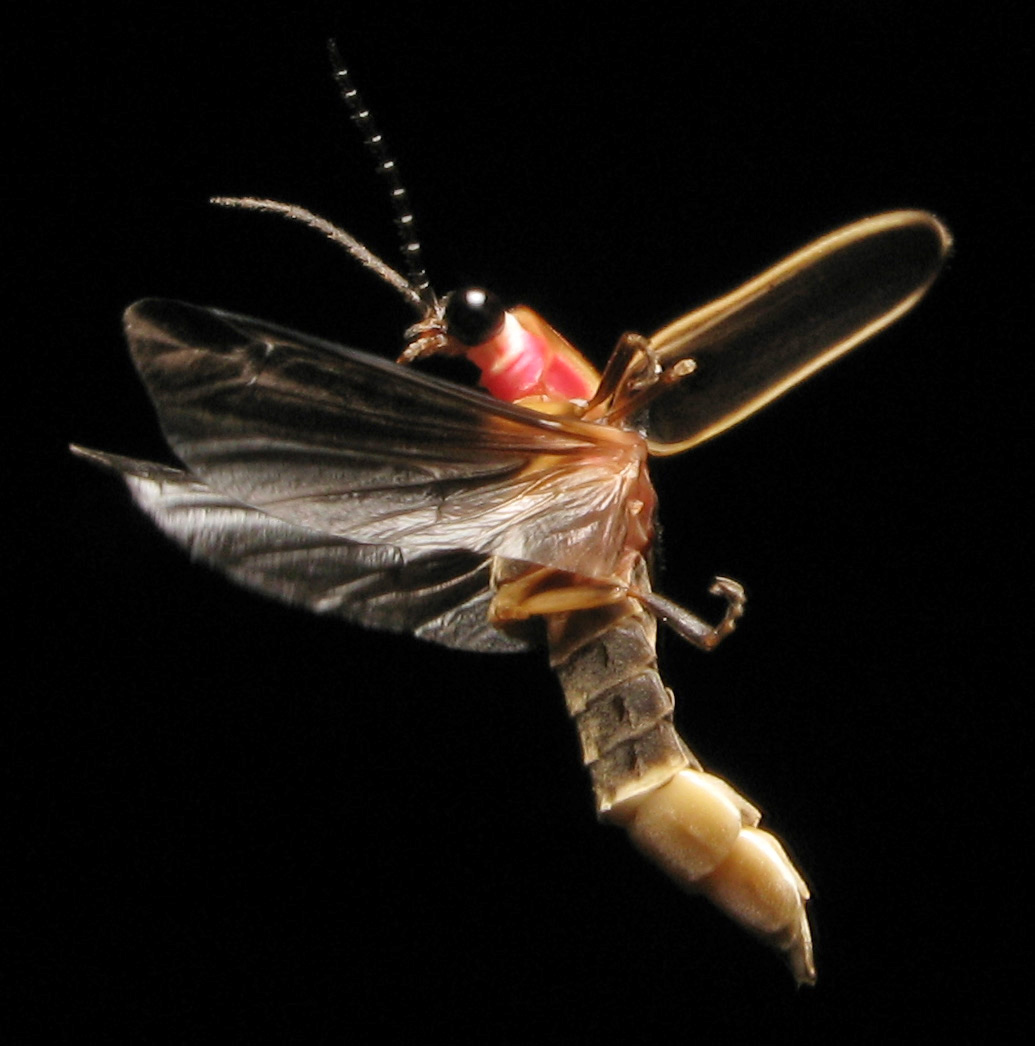
Photinus pyralis, firefly, in flight

The elytra allow beetles to both fly and move through confined spaces, doing so by folding the delicate wings under the elytra while not flying, and folding their wings out just before takeoff. The unfolding and folding of the wings is operated by muscles attached to the wing base; as long as the tension on the radial and cubital veins remains, the wings remain straight. Some beetle species (many Cetoniinae; some Scarabaeinae, Curculionidae and Buprestidae) fly with the elytra closed, with the metathoracic wings extended under the lateral elytra margins. The altitude reached by beetles in flight varies. One study investigating the flight altitude of the ladybird species Coccinella septempunctata and Harmonia axyridis using radar showed that, whilst the majority in flight over a single location were at 150–195 m above ground level, some reached altitudes of over 1100 m.

Many rove beetles have greatly reduced elytra, and while they are capable of flight, they most often move on the ground: their soft bodies and strong abdominal muscles make them flexible, easily able to wriggle into small cracks.

Aquatic beetles use several techniques for retaining air beneath the water's surface. Diving beetles (Dytiscidae) hold air between the abdomen and the elytra when diving. Hydrophilidae have hairs on their under surface that retain a layer of air against their bodies. Adult crawling water beetles use both their elytra and their hind coxae (the basal segment of the back legs) in air retention, while whirligig beetles simply carry an air bubble down with them whenever they dive.

=== Communication ===
Beetles have a variety of ways to communicate, including the use of pheromones. The mountain pine beetle emits a pheromone to attract other beetles to a tree. The mass of beetles are able to overcome the chemical defenses of the tree. After the tree's defenses have been exhausted, the beetles emit an anti-aggregation pheromone. This species can stridulate to communicate, but others may use sound to defend themselves when attacked.

=== Parental care ===
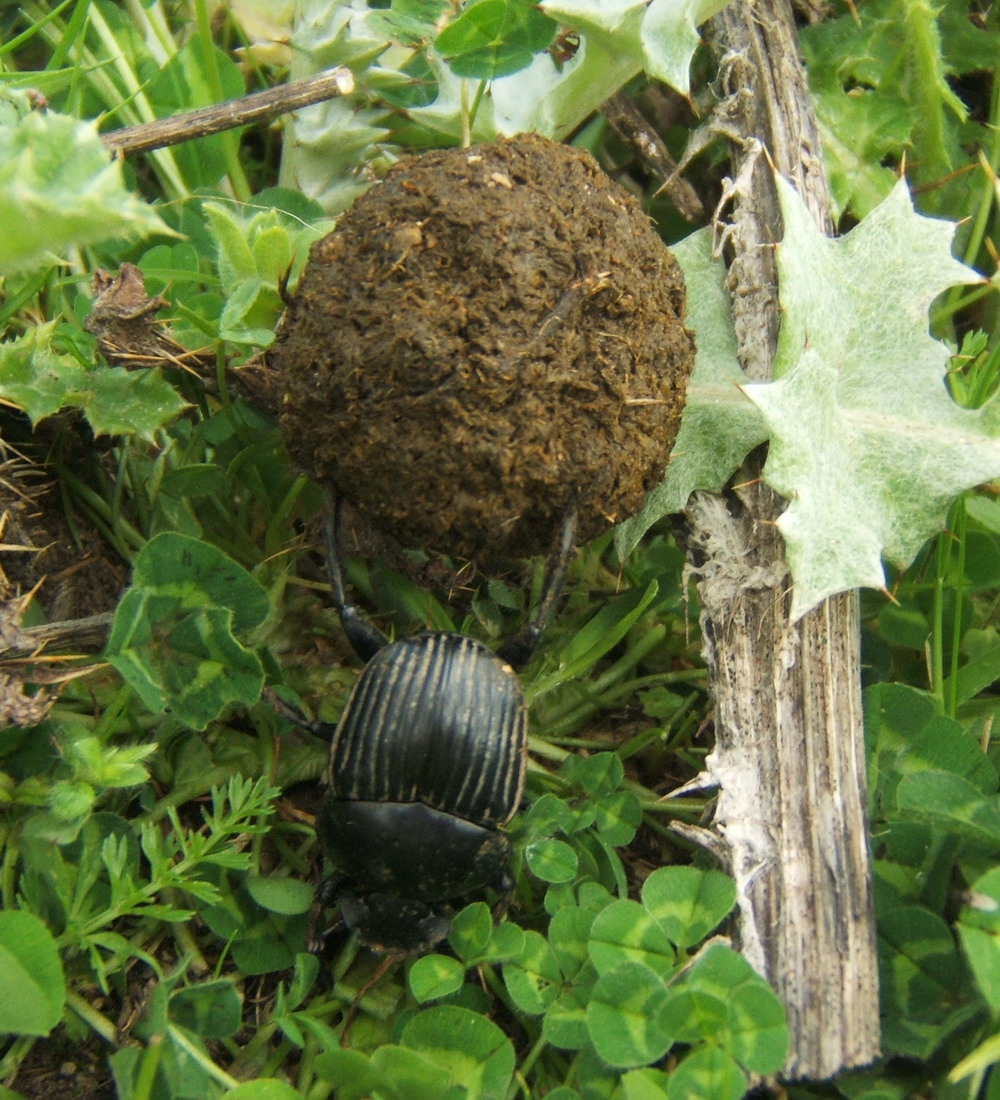
A dung beetle rolling dung to feed its young

Parental care is found in a few families of beetle, perhaps for protection against adverse conditions and predators. The rove beetle Bledius spectabilis lives in salt marshes, so the eggs and larvae are endangered by the rising tide. The maternal beetle patrols the eggs and larvae, burrowing to keep them from flooding and asphyxiating, and protects them from the predatory carabid beetle Dicheirotrichus gustavii and from the parasitoidal wasp Barycnemis blediator, which kills some 15% of the larvae.

Burying beetles are attentive parents, and participate in cooperative care and feeding of their offspring. Both parents work to bury small animal carcass to serve as a food resource for their young and build a brood chamber around it. The parents prepare the carcass and protect it from competitors and from early decomposition. After their eggs hatch, the parents keep the larvae clean of fungus and bacteria and help the larvae feed by regurgitating food for them. Some dung beetles provide parental care, collecting herbivore dung and laying eggs within that food supply, an instance of mass provisioning. Some species do not leave after this stage, but remain to safeguard their offspring.

Most other species of beetles do not provide parental care after the eggs have been laid.

Subsociality, where females guard their offspring, is well-documented in two families of Chrysomelidae, Cassidinae and Chrysomelinae.

=== Eusociality ===
Eusociality involves cooperative brood care (including brood care of offspring from other individuals), overlapping generations within a colony of adults, and a division of labor into reproductive and non-reproductive groups. Few organisms outside Hymenoptera exhibit this behavior; the only beetle to do so is the weevil Austroplatypus incompertus. This Australian species lives in horizontal networks of tunnels, in the heartwood of Eucalyptus trees. It is one of more than 300 species of wood-boring Ambrosia beetles which distribute the spores of ambrosia fungi. The fungi grow in the beetles' tunnels, providing food for the beetles and their larvae; female offspring remain in the tunnels and maintain the fungal growth, probably never reproducing. Cooperative brood care is also found in the bess beetles (Passalidae) where the larvae feed on the semi-digested faeces of the adults.

=== Feeding ===
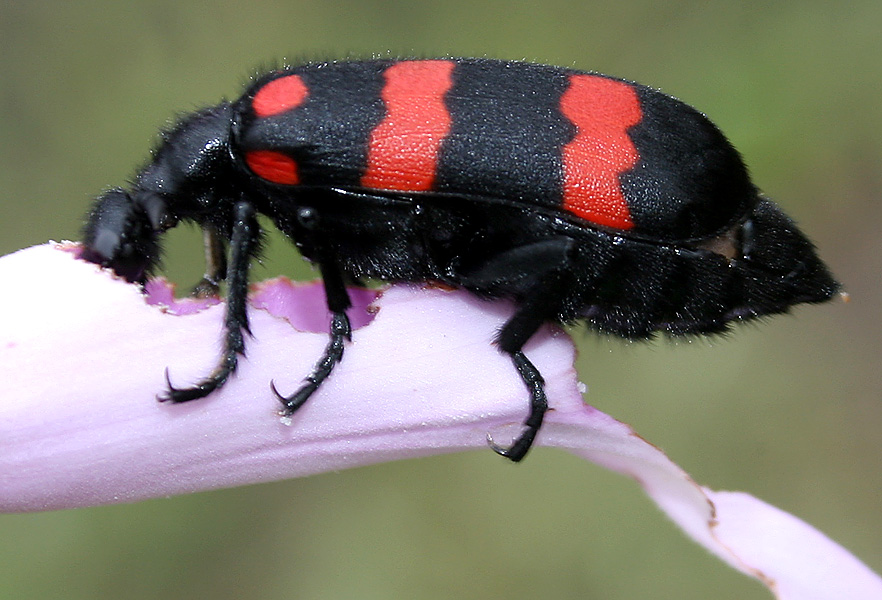
Hycleus sp. (Meloidae) feeding

Beetles are able to exploit a wide diversity of food sources available in their many habitats. Some are omnivores, eating both plants and animals. Other beetles are highly specialized in their diet. Many species of leaf beetles, longhorn beetles, and weevils are very host-specific, feeding on only a single species of plant. Ground beetles and rove beetles (Staphylinidae), among others, are primarily carnivorous and catch and consume many other arthropods and small prey, such as earthworms and snails. While most predatory beetles are generalists, a few species have more specific prey requirements or preferences. In some species, digestive ability relies upon a symbiotic relationship with fungi – some beetles have yeasts living their guts, including some yeasts previously undiscovered anywhere else.

Decaying organic matter is a primary diet for many species. This can range from dung, which is consumed by coprophagous species (such as certain scarab beetles in the Scarabaeidae), to dead animals, which are eaten by necrophagous species (such as the carrion beetles, Silphidae). Some beetles found in dung and carrion are in fact predatory. These include members of the Histeridae and Silphidae, preying on the larvae of coprophagous and necrophagous insects. Many beetles feed under bark, some feed on wood while others feed on fungi growing on wood or leaf-litter. Some beetles have special mycangia, structures for the transport of fungal spores.

== Ecology ==
=== Pollination ===
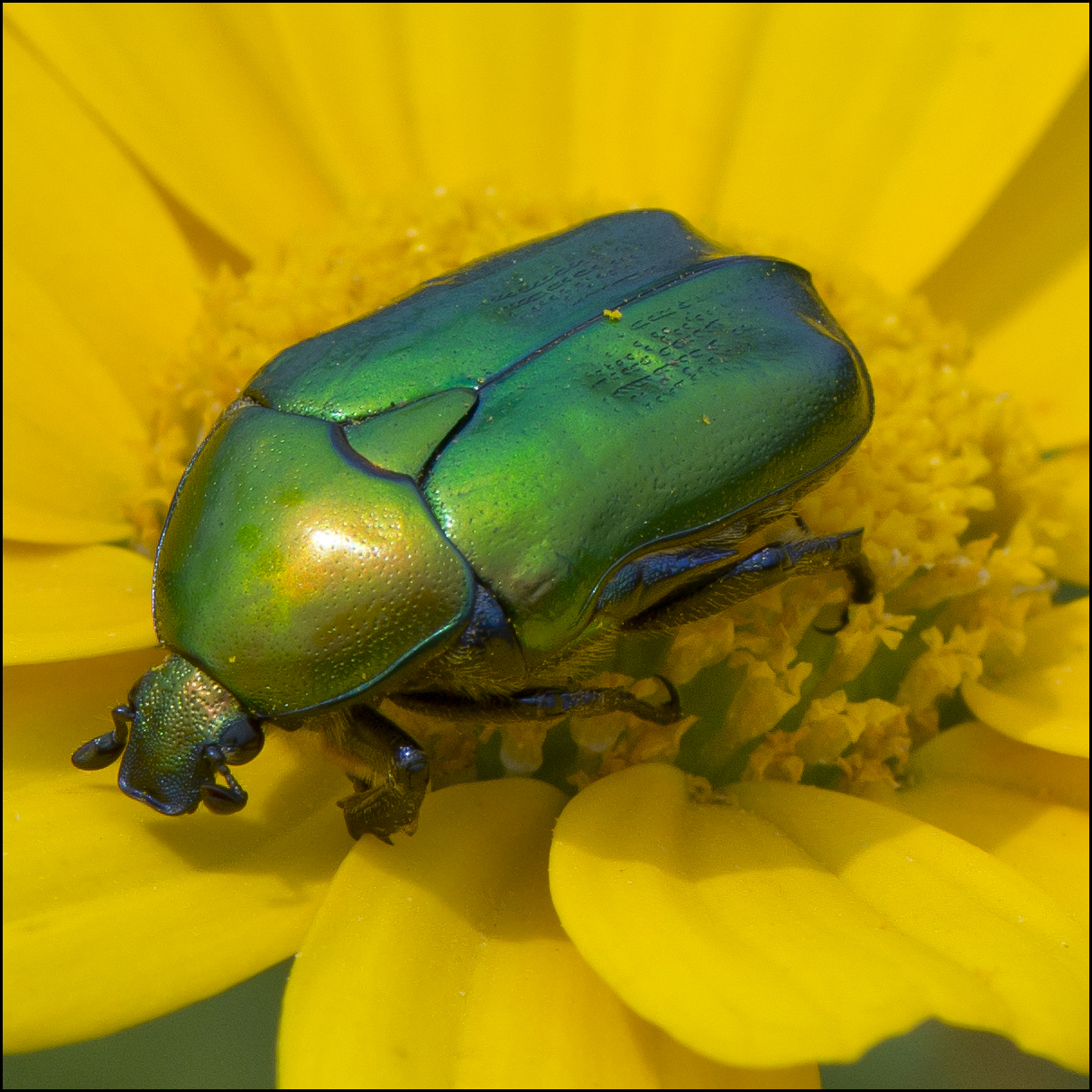
A copper flower-chafer (Protaetia cuprea ignicollis) on a crown daisy (Glebionis coronaria)

Beetle-pollinated flowers are usually large, greenish or off-white in color, and heavily scented. Scents may be spicy, fruity, or similar to decaying organic material. Beetles were most likely the first insects to pollinate flowers. Most beetle-pollinated flowers are flattened or dish-shaped, with pollen easily accessible, although they may include traps to keep the beetle longer. The plants' ovaries are usually well protected from the biting mouthparts of their pollinators. The beetle families that habitually pollinate flowers are the Buprestidae, Cantharidae, Cerambycidae, Cleridae, Dermestidae, Lycidae, Melyridae, Mordellidae, Nitidulidae and Scarabaeidae. Beetles may be particularly important in some parts of the world such as semiarid areas of southern Africa and southern California and the montane grasslands of KwaZulu-Natal in South Africa.

=== Parasitism ===
A few species of beetles are ectoparasitic on mammals. One such species, Platypsyllus castoris, parasitises beavers (Castor spp.). This beetle lives as a parasite both as a larva and as an adult, feeding on epidermal tissue and possibly on skin secretions and wound exudates. They are strikingly flattened dorsoventrally, no doubt as an adaptation for slipping between the beavers' hairs. They are wingless and eyeless, as are many other ectoparasites. Others are kleptoparasites of other invertebrates, such as the small hive beetle (Aethina tumida) that infests honey bee nests, while many species are parasitic inquilines or commensal in the nests of ants. A few groups of beetles are primary parasitoids of other insects, feeding off of, and eventually killing their hosts.

=== Mutualism ===
1: Adult ambrosia beetle burrows into wood and lays eggs, carrying fungal spores in its mycangia. 2: Larva feeds on fungus, which digests wood, removing toxins, to mutual benefit. 3: Larva pupates.

Mutualism is well known in a few beetles, such as the ambrosia beetle, which partners with fungi to digest the wood of dead trees. The beetles excavate tunnels in dead trees in which they cultivate fungal gardens, their sole source of nutrition. After landing on a suitable tree, an ambrosia beetle excavates a tunnel in which it releases spores of its fungal symbiont. The fungus penetrates the plant's xylem tissue, digests it, and concentrates the nutrients on and near the surface of the beetle gallery, so the weevils and the fungus both benefit. The beetles cannot eat the wood due to toxins, and uses its relationship with fungi to help overcome the defenses of its host tree in order to provide nutrition for their larvae. Chemically mediated by a bacterially produced polyunsaturated peroxide, this mutualistic relationship between the beetle and the fungus is coevolved.

=== Tolerance of extreme environments ===
About 90% of beetle species enter a period of adult diapause, a quiet phase with reduced metabolism to tide unfavourable environmental conditions. Adult diapause is the most common form of diapause in Coleoptera. To endure the period without food (often lasting many months) adults prepare by accumulating reserves of lipids, glycogen, proteins and other substances needed for resistance to future hazardous changes of environmental conditions. This diapause is induced by signals heralding the arrival of the unfavourable season; usually the cue is photoperiodic. Short (decreasing) day length serves as a signal of approaching winter and induces winter diapause (hibernation). A study of hibernation in the Arctic beetle Pterostichus brevicornis showed that the body fat levels of adults were highest in autumn with the alimentary canal filled with food, but empty by the end of January. This loss of body fat was a gradual process, occurring in combination with dehydration.

All insects are poikilothermic, so the ability of a few beetles to live in extreme environments depends on their resilience to unusually high or low temperatures. The bark beetle Pityogenes chalcographus can survive −39°C whilst overwintering beneath tree bark; the Alaskan beetle Cucujus clavipes puniceus is able to withstand −58°C; its larvae may survive −100°C. At these low temperatures, the formation of ice crystals in internal fluids is the biggest threat to survival to beetles, but this is prevented through the production of antifreeze proteins that stop water molecules from grouping together. The low temperatures experienced by Cucujus clavipes can be survived through their deliberate dehydration in conjunction with the antifreeze proteins. This concentrates the antifreezes several fold. The hemolymph of the mealworm beetle Tenebrio molitor contains several antifreeze proteins. The Alaskan beetle Upis ceramboides can survive −60 °C: its cryoprotectants are xylomannan, a molecule consisting of a sugar bound to a fatty acid, and the sugar-alcohol, threitol.

Conversely, desert dwelling beetles are adapted to tolerate high temperatures. For example, the Tenebrionid beetle Onymacris rugatipennis can withstand 50°C. Tiger beetles in hot, sandy areas are often whitish (for example, Habroscelimorpha dorsalis), to reflect more heat than a darker color would. These beetles also exhibits behavioural adaptions to tolerate the heat: they are able to stand erect on their tarsi to hold their bodies away from the hot ground, seek shade, and turn to face the sun so that only the front parts of their heads are directly exposed.

The fogstand beetle of the Namib Desert, Stenocara gracilipes, is able to collect water from fog, as its elytra have a textured surface combining hydrophilic (water-loving) bumps and waxy, hydrophobic troughs. The beetle faces the early morning breeze, holding up its abdomen; droplets condense on the elytra and run along ridges towards their mouthparts. Similar adaptations are found in several other Namib desert beetles such as Onymacris unguicularis.

Some terrestrial beetles that exploit shoreline and floodplain habitats have physiological adaptations for surviving floods. In the event of flooding, adult beetles may be mobile enough to move away from flooding, but larvae and pupa often cannot. Adults of Cicindela togata are unable to survive immersion in water, but larvae are able to survive a prolonged period, up to 6 days, of anoxia during floods. Anoxia tolerance in the larvae may have been sustained by switching to anaerobic metabolic pathways or by reducing metabolic rate. Anoxia tolerance in the adult carabid beetle Pelophilia borealis was tested in laboratory conditions and it was found that they could survive a continuous period of up to 127 days in an atmosphere of 99.9% nitrogen at 0 °C.

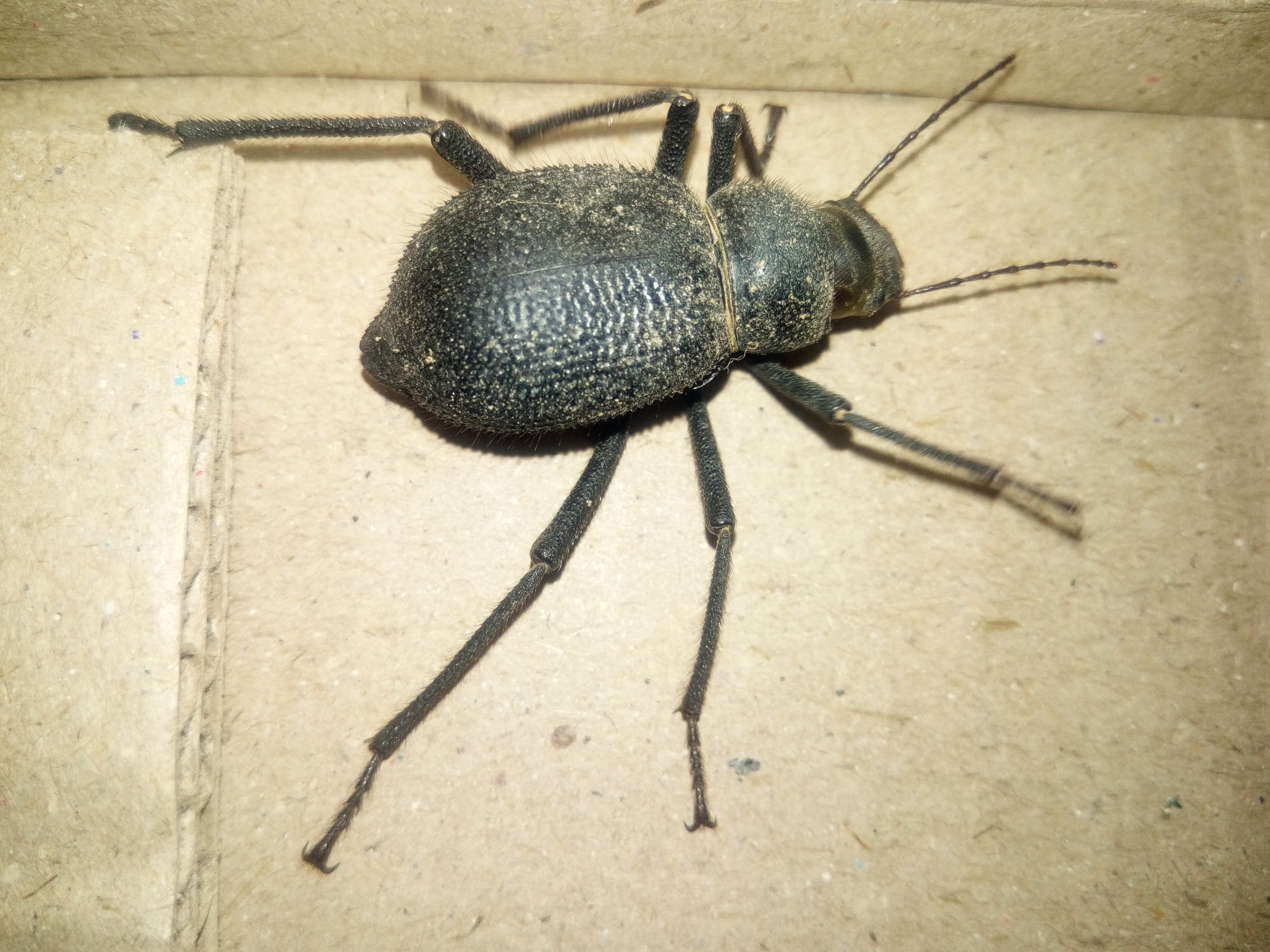
Tenebrionid beetle in the Thar Desert

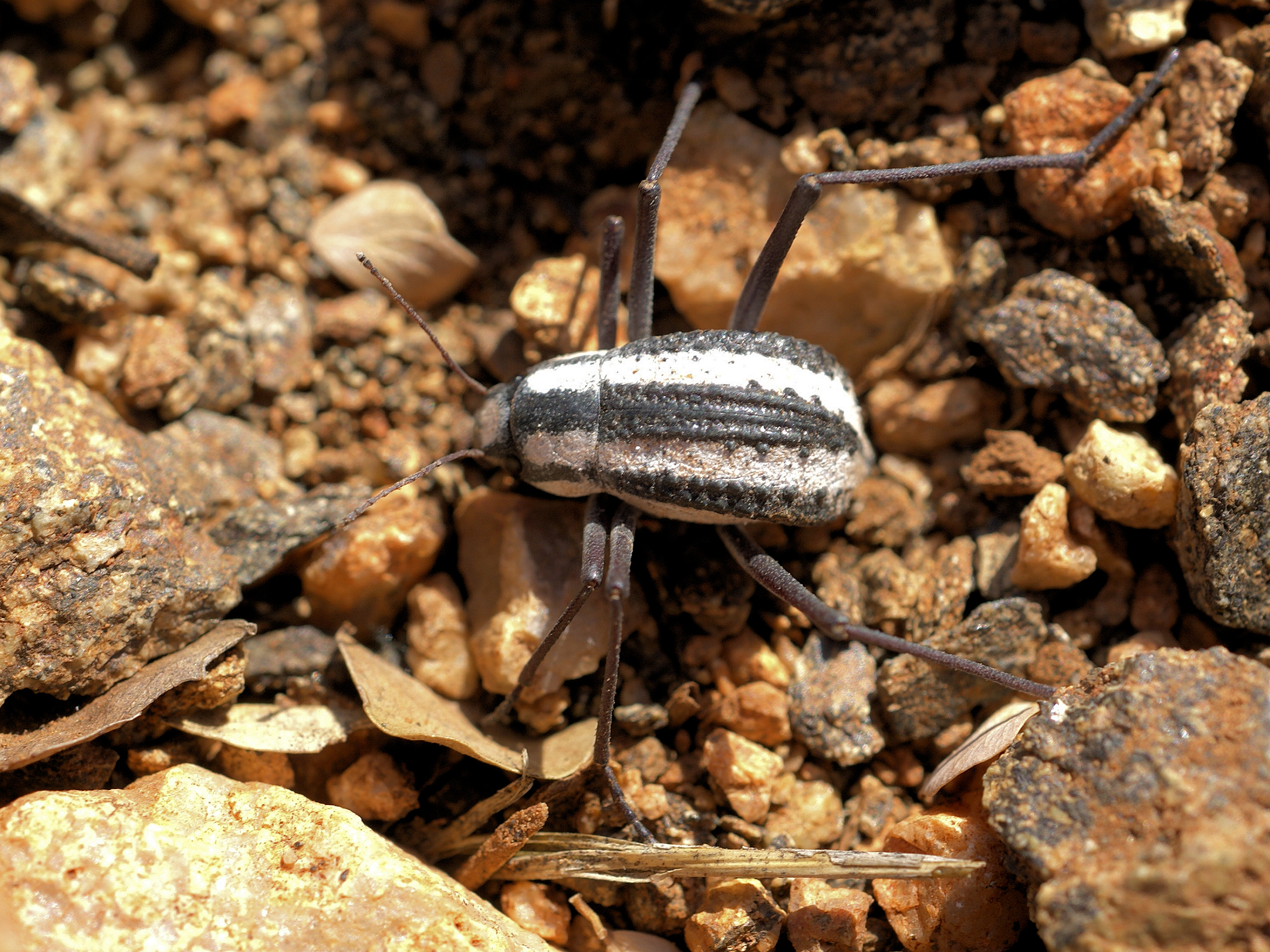
The fogstand beetle of the Namib Desert, Stenocara gracilipes, survives by collecting water from fog on its back.

=== Anti-predator adaptations ===
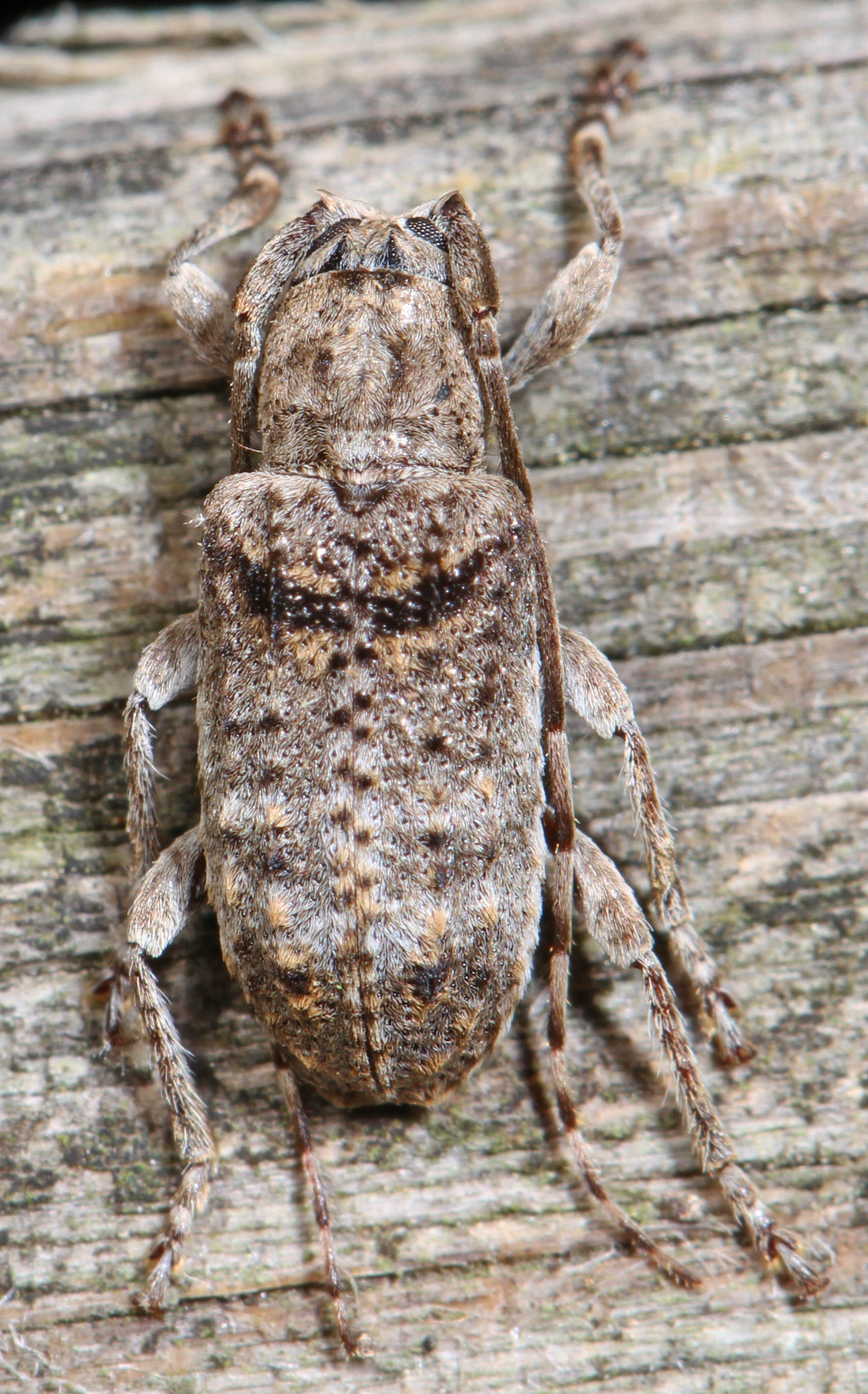
A camouflaged longhorn beetle, Ecyrus dasycerus

Beetles, both adults and larvae, are the prey of many animal predators including mammals from bats to rodents, birds, lizards, amphibians, fishes, dragonflies, robberflies, reduviid bugs, ants, other beetles, and spiders. Beetles use a variety of anti-predator adaptations to defend themselves. These include camouflage and mimicry against predators that hunt by sight, toxicity, and defensive behaviour.

==== Camouflage ====
Camouflage is common and widespread among beetle families, especially those that feed on wood or vegetation, such as leaf beetles (Chrysomelidae, which are often green) and weevils. In some species, sculpturing or various colored scales or hairs cause beetles such as the avocado weevil Heilipus apiatus to resemble bird dung or other inedible objects. Many beetles that live in sandy environments blend in with the coloration of that substrate.

==== Mimicry and aposematism ====
Some longhorn beetles (Cerambycidae) are effective Batesian mimics of wasps. Beetles may combine coloration with behavioural mimicry, acting like the wasps they already closely resemble. Many other beetles, including ladybirds, blister beetles, and lycid beetles secrete distasteful or toxic substances to make them unpalatable or poisonous, and are often aposematic, where bright or contrasting coloration warn off predators; many beetles and other insects mimic these chemically protected species.

Chemical defence is important in some species, usually advertised by bright aposematic coloration. Some Tenebrionidae use their posture for releasing noxious chemicals to warn off predators. Chemical defences may serve purposes other than just protection from vertebrates, such as protection from a wide range of microbes. Some species sequester chemicals from the plants they feed on, incorporating them into their own defences.

Other species have special glands to produce deterrent chemicals. The defensive glands of carabid ground beetles produce a variety of hydrocarbons, aldehydes, phenols, quinones, esters, and acids released from an opening at the end of the abdomen. African carabid beetles (for example, Anthia) employ the same chemicals as ants: formic acid. Bombardier beetles have well-developed pygidial glands that empty from the sides of the intersegment membranes between the seventh and eighth abdominal segments. The gland is made of two containing chambers, one for hydroquinones and hydrogen peroxide, the other holding hydrogen peroxide and catalase enzymes. These chemicals mix and result in an explosive ejection, reaching a temperature of around 100 °C (212 °F), with the breakdown of hydroquinone to hydrogen, oxygen, and quinone. The oxygen propels the noxious chemical spray as a jet that can be aimed accurately at predators.

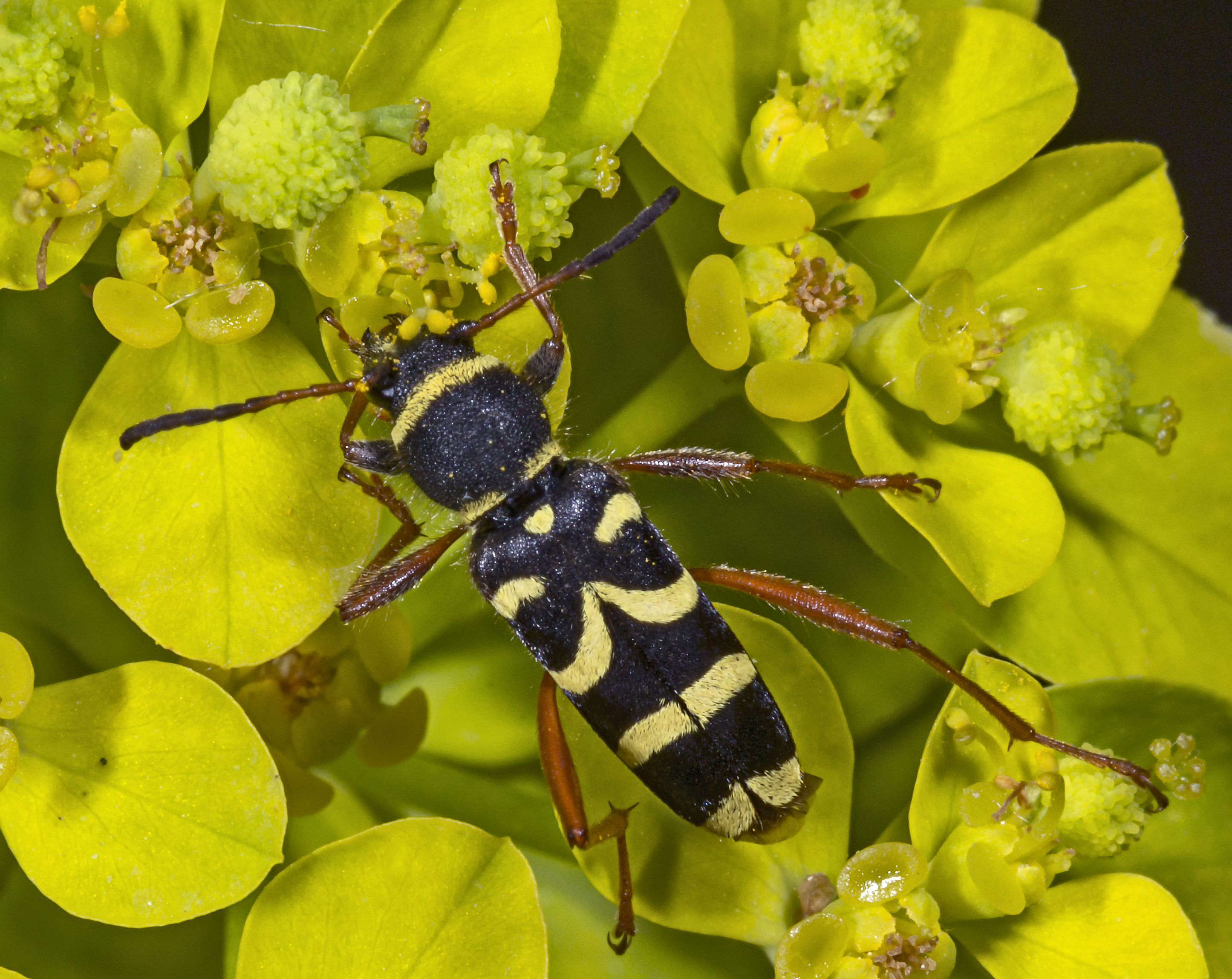
Clytus arietis (Cerambycidae), a Batesian mimic of wasps

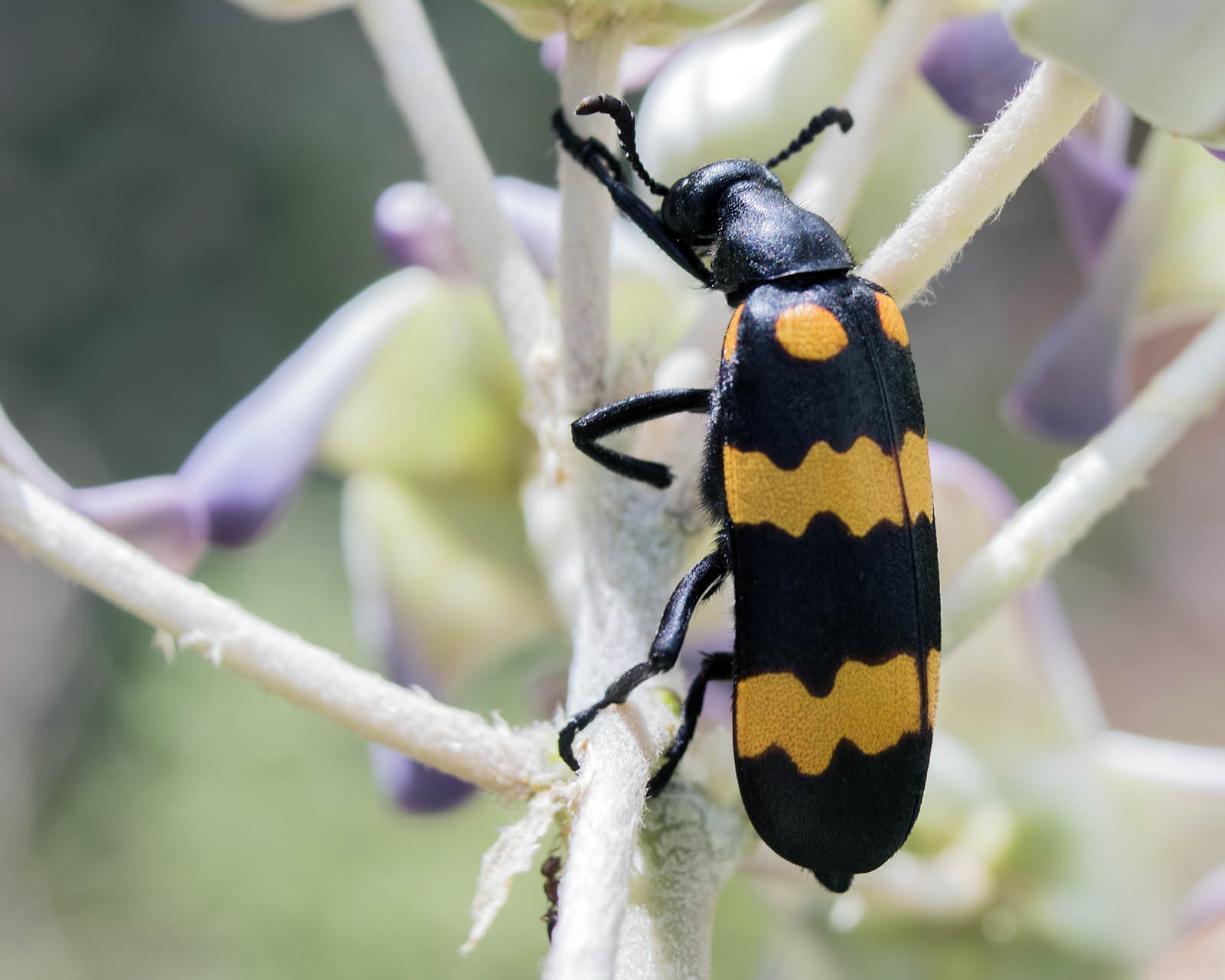
Blister beetles such as Hycleus have brilliant aposematic coloration, warning of their toxicity.

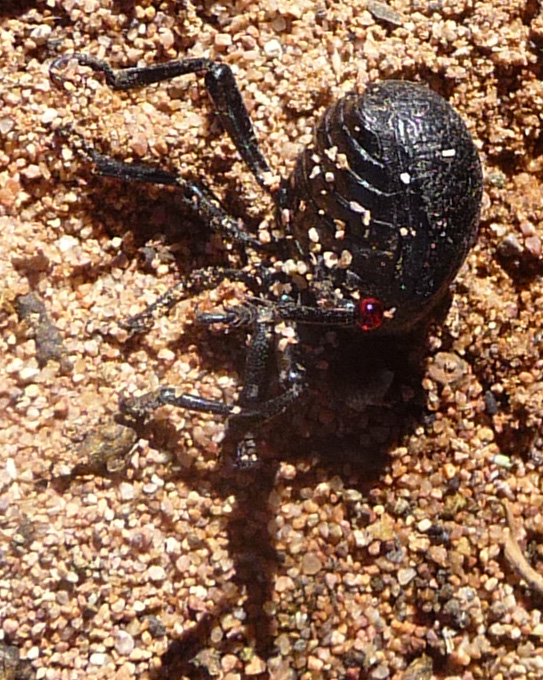
The bloody-nosed beetle, Timarcha tenebricosa, defending itself by releasing a droplet of noxious red liquid (base of leg, right)

==== Other defences ====
Large ground-dwelling beetles such as Carabidae, the rhinoceros beetle and the longhorn beetles defend themselves using strong mandibles, or heavily sclerotised (armored) spines or horns to deter or fight off predators. Many species of weevil that feed out in the open on leaves of plants react to attack by employing a drop-off reflex. Some combine it with thanatosis, in which they close up their appendages and "play dead". The click beetles (Elateridae) can suddenly catapult themselves out of danger by releasing the energy stored by a click mechanism, which consists of a stout spine on the prosternum and a matching groove in the mesosternum. Some species startle an attacker by producing sounds through stridulation.

=== Migration ===
Many beetle species undertake annual mass movements which are termed as migrations. These include the pollen beetle Meligethes aeneus and many species of coccinellids. These mass movements may also be opportunistic, in search of food, rather than seasonal. A 2008 study of an unusually large outbreak of Mountain Pine Beetle (Dendroctonus ponderosae) in British Columbia found that beetles were capable of flying 30–110 km per day in densities of up to 18,600 beetles per hectare.

== Relationship to humans ==
=== In ancient cultures ===
xpr
Scarab
in hieroglyphs

Gardiner: L1

Several species of dung beetle, especially the sacred scarab, Scarabaeus sacer, were revered in Ancient Egypt. The hieroglyphic image of the beetle may have had existential, fictional, or ontologic significance. Images of the scarab in bone, ivory, stone, Egyptian faience, and precious metals are known from the Sixth Dynasty and up to the period of Roman rule. The scarab was of prime significance in the funerary cult of ancient Egypt. The scarab was linked to Khepri, the god of the rising sun, from the supposed resemblance of the rolling of the dung ball by the beetle to the rolling of the sun by the god. Some of ancient Egypt's neighbors adopted the scarab motif for seals of varying types. The best-known of these are the Judean LMLK seals, where eight of 21 designs contained scarab beetles, which were used exclusively to stamp impressions on storage jars during the reign of Hezekiah. Beetles are mentioned as a symbol of the sun, as in ancient Egypt, in Plutarch's 1st century Moralia. The Greek Magical Papyri of the 2nd century BC to the 5th century AD describe scarabs as an ingredient in a spell.

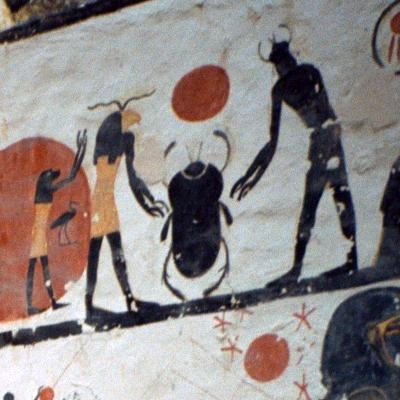
A scarab in the
Valley of the Kings

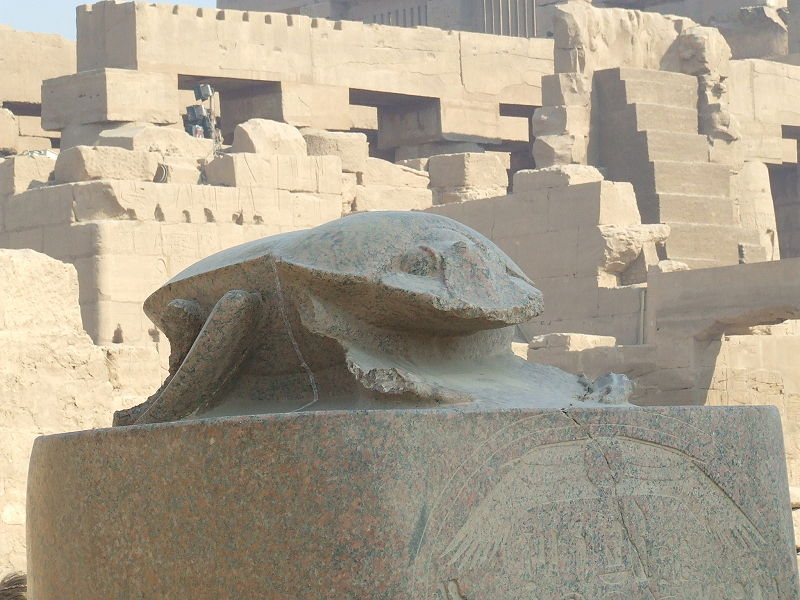
A large scarab statue at Karnak

Pliny the Elder discusses beetles in his Natural History, describing the stag beetle: "Some insects, for the preservation of their wings, are covered with an erust (elytra)—the beetle, for instance, the wing of which is peculiarly fine and frail. To these insects a sting has been denied by Nature; but in one large kind we find horns of a remarkable length, two-pronged at the extremities, and forming pincers, which the animal closes when it is its intention to bite." The stag beetle is recorded in a Greek myth by Nicander and recalled by Antoninus Liberalis in which Cerambus (Note: The wood-gnawing longhorn beetle genus Cerambyx is named for him.) is turned into a beetle: "He can be seen on trunks and has hook-teeth, ever moving his jaws together. He is black, long and has hard wings like a great dung beetle". The story concludes with the comment that the beetles were used as toys by young boys, and that the head was removed and worn as a pendant.

=== As pests ===
About 75% of beetle species are phytophagous in both the larval and adult stages. Many feed on economically important plants and stored plant products, including trees, cereals, tobacco, and dried fruits. Some, such as the boll weevil, which feeds on cotton buds and flowers, can cause extremely serious damage to agriculture. The boll weevil crossed the Rio Grande near Brownsville, Texas, to enter the United States from Mexico around 1892, and had reached southeastern Alabama by 1915. By the mid-1920s, it had entered all cotton-growing regions in the US, traveling 40 to 160 miles (60–260 km) per year. It remains the most destructive cotton pest in North America. Mississippi State University has estimated, since the boll weevil entered the United States, it has cost cotton producers about $13 billion, and in recent times about $300 million per year.

The bark beetle, elm leaf beetle and the Asian longhorned beetle (Anoplophora glabripennis) are among the species that attack elm trees. Bark beetles (Scolytidae) carry Dutch elm disease as they move from infected breeding sites to healthy trees. The disease has devastated elm trees across Europe and North America.

Some species of beetle have evolved immunity to insecticides. For example, the Colorado potato beetle, Leptinotarsa decemlineata, is a destructive pest of potato plants. Its hosts include other members of the Solanaceae, such as nightshade, tomato, eggplant and capsicum, as well as the potato. Different populations have between them developed resistance to all major classes of insecticide. The Colorado potato beetle was evaluated as a tool of entomological warfare during World War II, the idea being to use the beetle and its larvae to damage the crops of enemy nations. Germany tested its Colorado potato beetle weaponisation program south of Frankfurt, releasing 54,000 beetles.

The death watch beetle, Xestobium rufovillosum (Ptinidae), is a serious pest of older wooden buildings in Europe. It attacks hardwoods such as oak and chestnut, always where some fungal decay has taken or is taking place. The actual introduction of the pest into buildings is thought to take place at the time of construction.

Other pests include the coconut hispine beetle, Brontispa longissima, which feeds on young leaves, seedlings and mature coconut trees, causing serious economic damage in the Philippines. The mountain pine beetle is a destructive pest of mature or weakened lodgepole pine, sometimes affecting large areas of Canada.

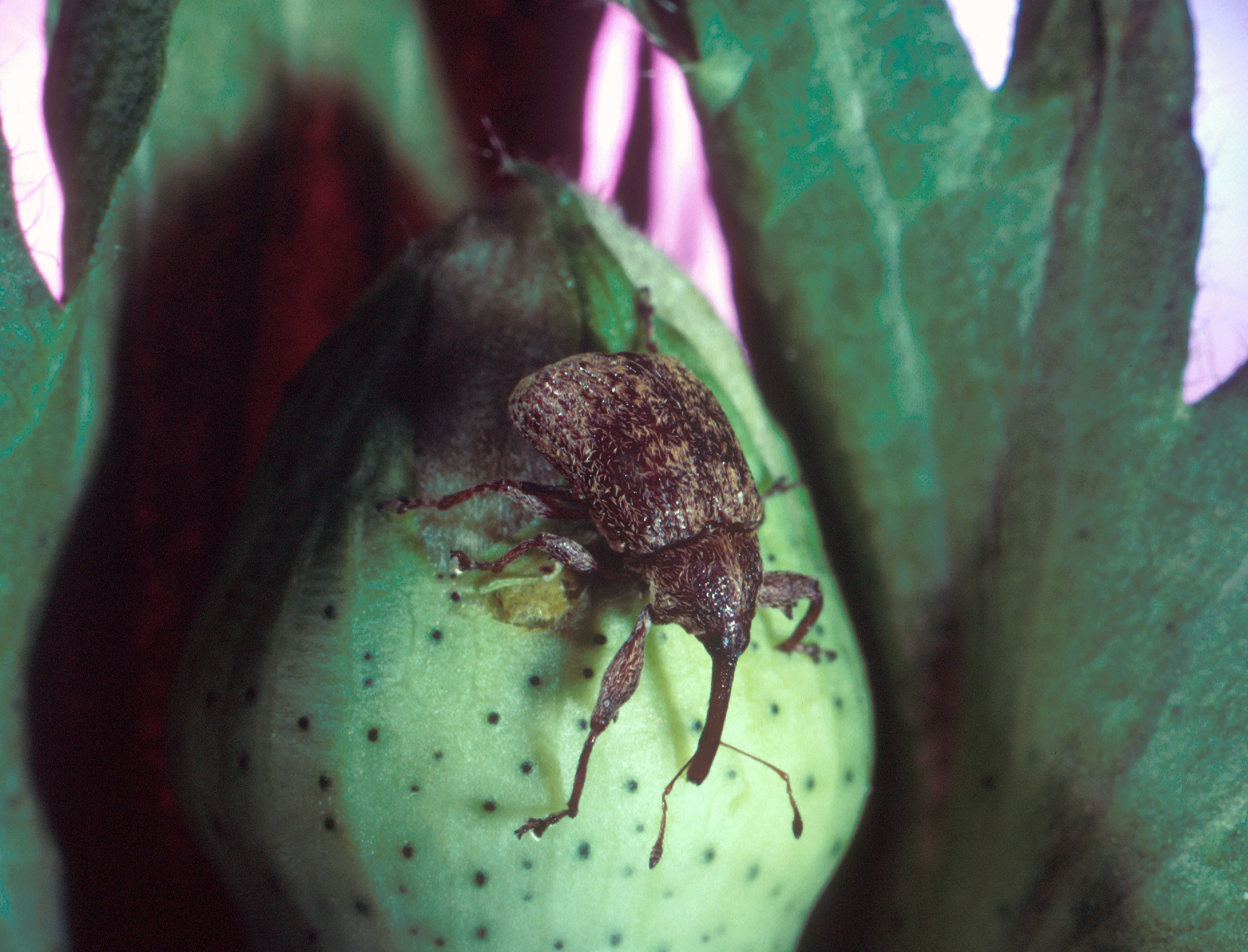
The boll weevil, Anthonomus grandis, historically devastated cotton farms throughout the southern United States.

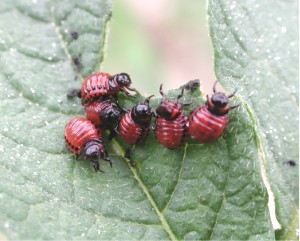
Larvae of the Colorado potato beetle, Leptinotarsa decemlineata, a serious crop pest

=== As beneficial resources ===
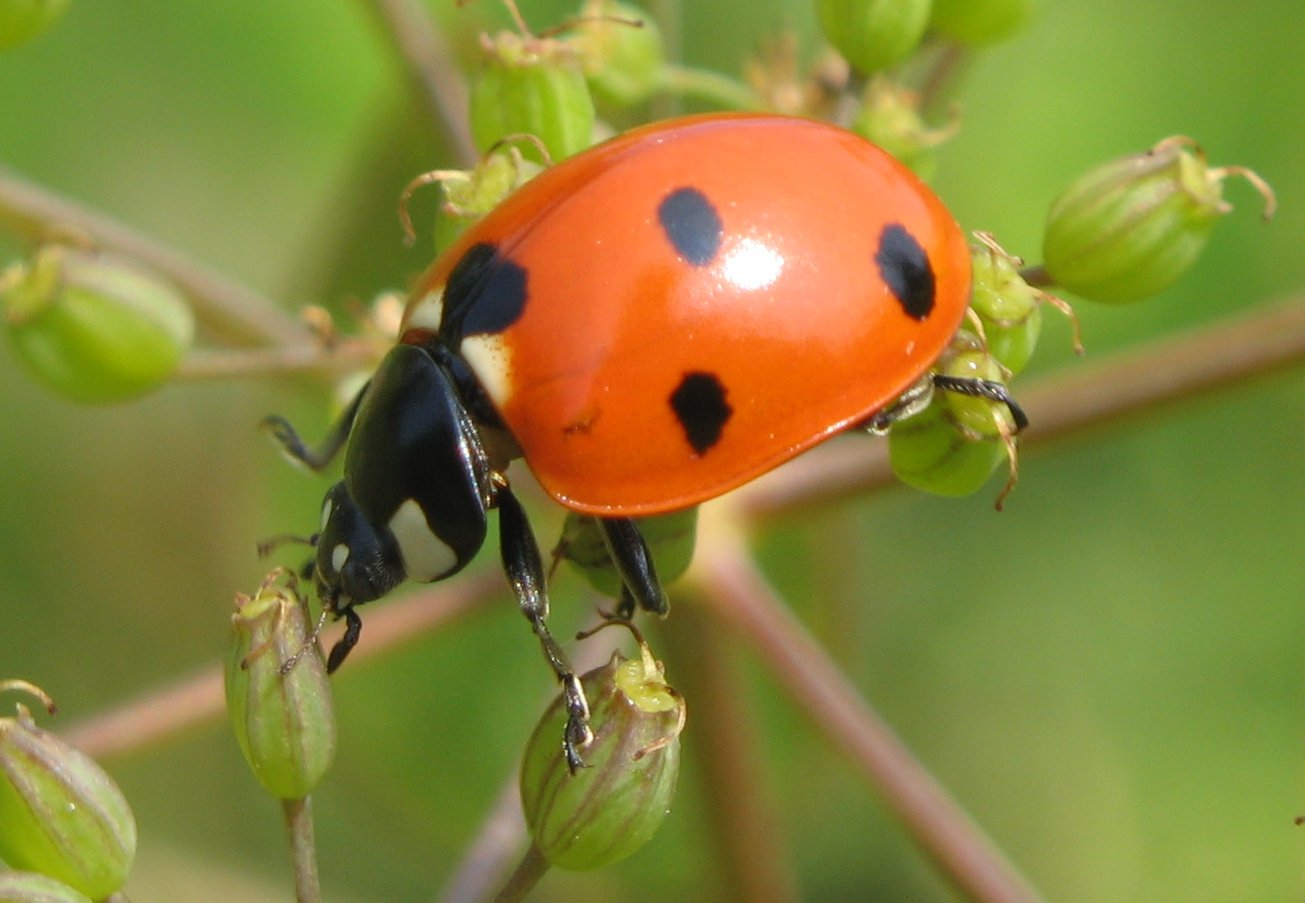
Coccinella septempunctata, a predatory beetle beneficial to agriculture

Beetles can be beneficial to human economics by controlling the populations of pests. The larvae and adults of some species of lady beetles (Coccinellidae) feed on aphids that are pests. Other lady beetles feed on scale insects, whitefly and mealybugs. If normal food sources are scarce, they may feed on small caterpillars, young plant bugs, or honeydew and nectar. Ground beetles (Carabidae) are common predators of many insect pests, including fly eggs, caterpillars, and wireworms. Ground beetles can help to control weeds by eating their seeds in the soil, reducing the need for herbicides to protect crops. The effectiveness of some species in reducing certain plant populations has resulted in the deliberate introduction of beetles in order to control weeds. For example, the genus Calligrapha is native to North America but has been used to control Parthenium hysterophorus in India and Ambrosia artemisiifolia in Russia.

Dung beetles (Scarabidae) have been successfully used to reduce the populations of pestilent flies, such as Musca vetustissima and Haematobia exigua which are serious pests of cattle in Australia. The beetles make the dung unavailable to breeding pests by quickly rolling and burying it in the soil, with the added effect of improving soil fertility, tilth, and nutrient cycling. The Australian Dung Beetle Project (1965–1985), introduced species of dung beetle to Australia from South Africa and Europe to reduce populations of Musca vetustissima, following successful trials of this technique in Hawaii. The American Institute of Biological Sciences reports that dung beetles, such as Euoniticellus intermedius, save the United States cattle industry an estimated US$380 million annually through burying above-ground livestock feces.

The Dermestidae are often used in taxidermy and in the preparation of scientific specimens, to clean soft tissue from bones. Larvae feed on and remove cartilage along with other soft tissue.

=== As food and medicine ===
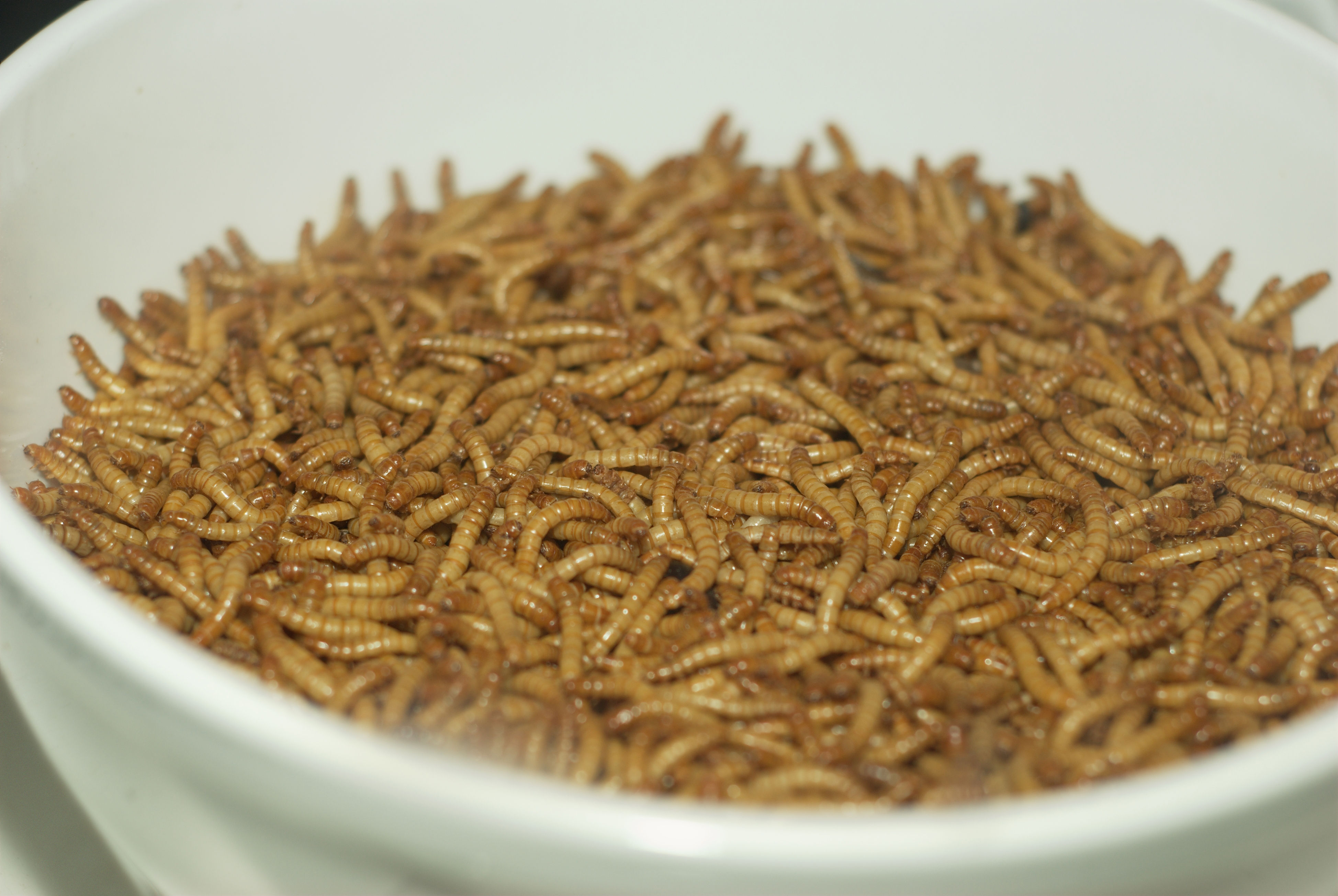
Mealworms in a bowl for human consumption

Beetles are the most widely eaten insects, with about 344 species used as food, usually at the larval stage. The mealworm (the larva of the darkling beetle) and the rhinoceros beetle are among the species commonly eaten. A wide range of species is also used in folk medicine to treat those suffering from a variety of disorders and illnesses, though this is done without clinical studies supporting the efficacy of such treatments.

=== As biodiversity indicators ===
Due to their habitat specificity, many species of beetles have been suggested as suitable as indicators, their presence, numbers, or absence providing a measure of habitat quality. Predatory beetles such as the tiger beetles (Cicindelidae) have found scientific use as indicator species for measuring regional patterns of biodiversity. They are suitable for this as their taxonomy is stable; their life history is well described; they are large and simple to observe when visiting a site; they occur around the world in many habitats, with species specialised to particular habitats; and their occurrence by species accurately indicates other species, both vertebrate and invertebrate. According to the habitats, many other groups such as the rove beetles in human-modified habitats, dung beetles in savannas and saproxylic beetles in forests have been suggested as potential indicator species.

=== In art and adornment ===
Many beetles have durable elytra that has been used as material in art, with beetlewing the best example. Sometimes, they are incorporated into ritual objects for their religious significance. Whole beetles, either as-is or encased in clear plastic, are made into objects ranging from cheap souvenirs such as key chains to expensive fine-art jewellery. In parts of Mexico, beetles of the genus Zopherus are made into living brooches by attaching costume jewelry and golden chains, which is made possible by the incredibly hard elytra and sedentary habits of the genus.

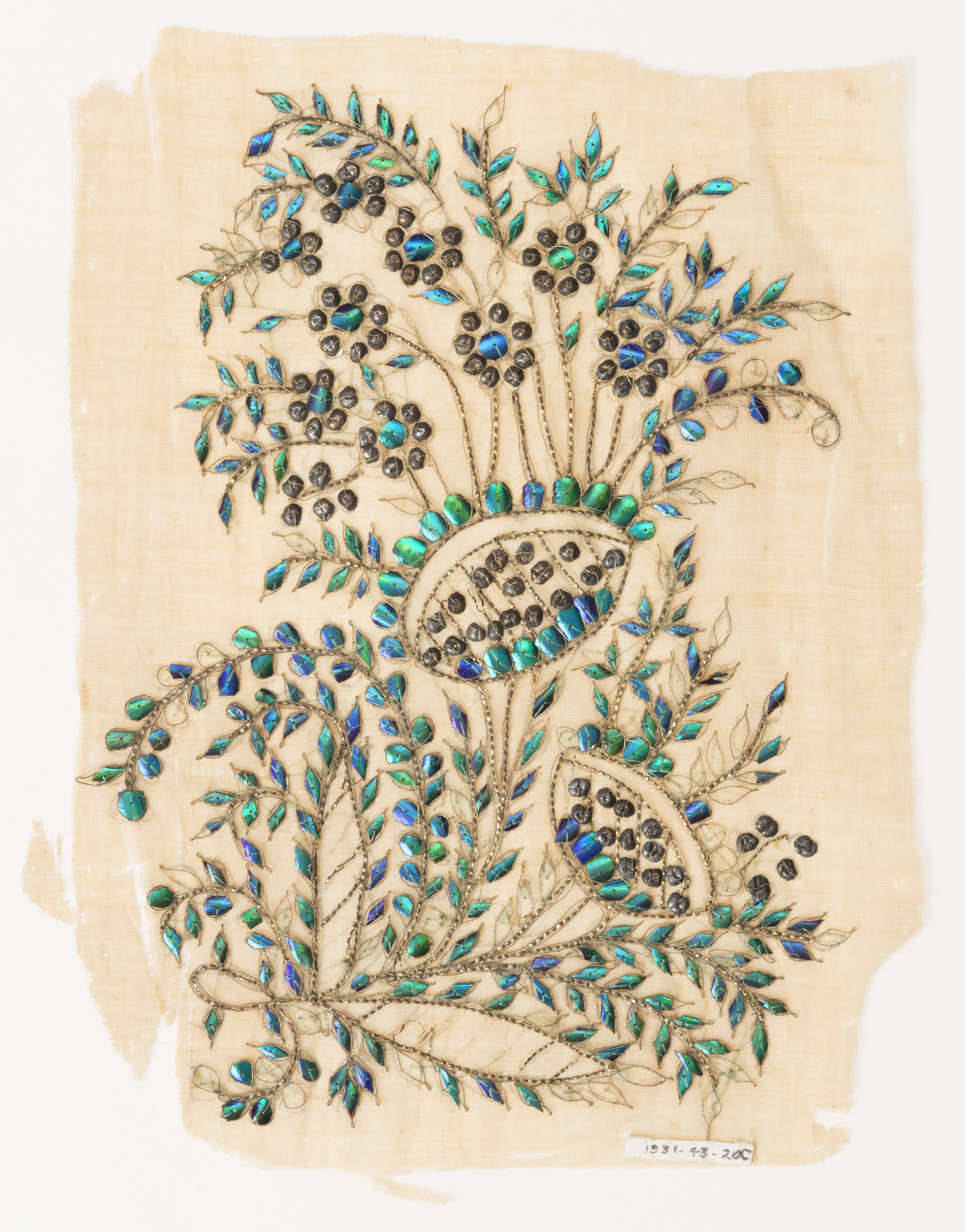
Beetlewing art. India, 19th century

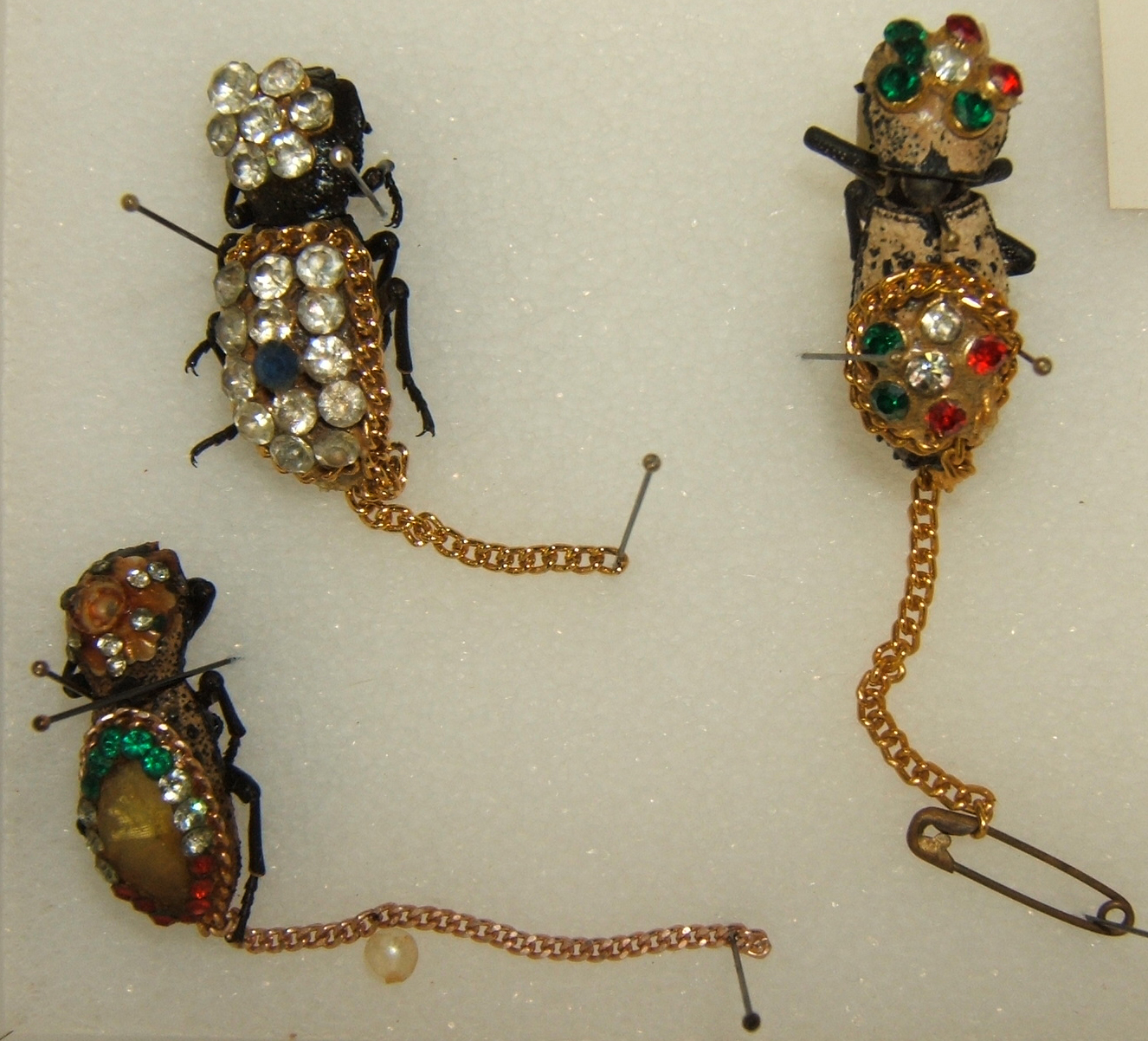
Preserved living brooches: Zopheridae in jewellery

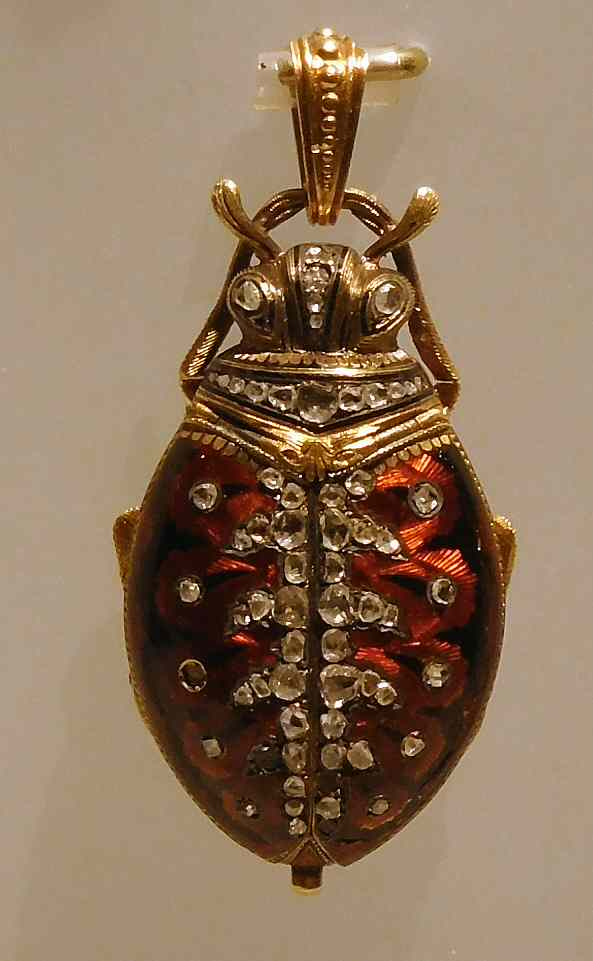
Pendant watch in shape of beetle. Switzerland, 19th century

=== In entertainment ===
Fighting beetles are used for entertainment and gambling. This sport exploits the territorial behavior and mating competition of certain species of large beetles. In the Chiang Mai district of northern Thailand, male Xylotrupes rhinoceros beetles are caught in the wild and trained for fighting. Females are held inside a log to stimulate the fighting males with their pheromones. These fights may be competitive and involve gambling both money and property. In South Korea the Dytiscidae species Cybister tripunctatus is used in a roulette-like game.

Beetles are sometimes used as instruments: the Onabasulu of Papua New Guinea historically used the "hugu" weevil Rhynchophorus ferrugineus as a musical instrument by letting the human mouth serve as a variable resonance chamber for the wing vibrations of the live adult beetle.

=== As pets ===
Some species of beetle are kept as pets, for example diving beetles (Dytiscidae) may be kept in a domestic fresh water tank. In Japan the practice of keeping horned rhinoceros beetles (Dynastinae) and stag beetles (Lucanidae) is particularly popular amongst young boys. Such is the popularity in Japan that vending machines dispensing live beetles were developed in 1999, each holding up to 100 stag beetles.

=== As things to collect ===
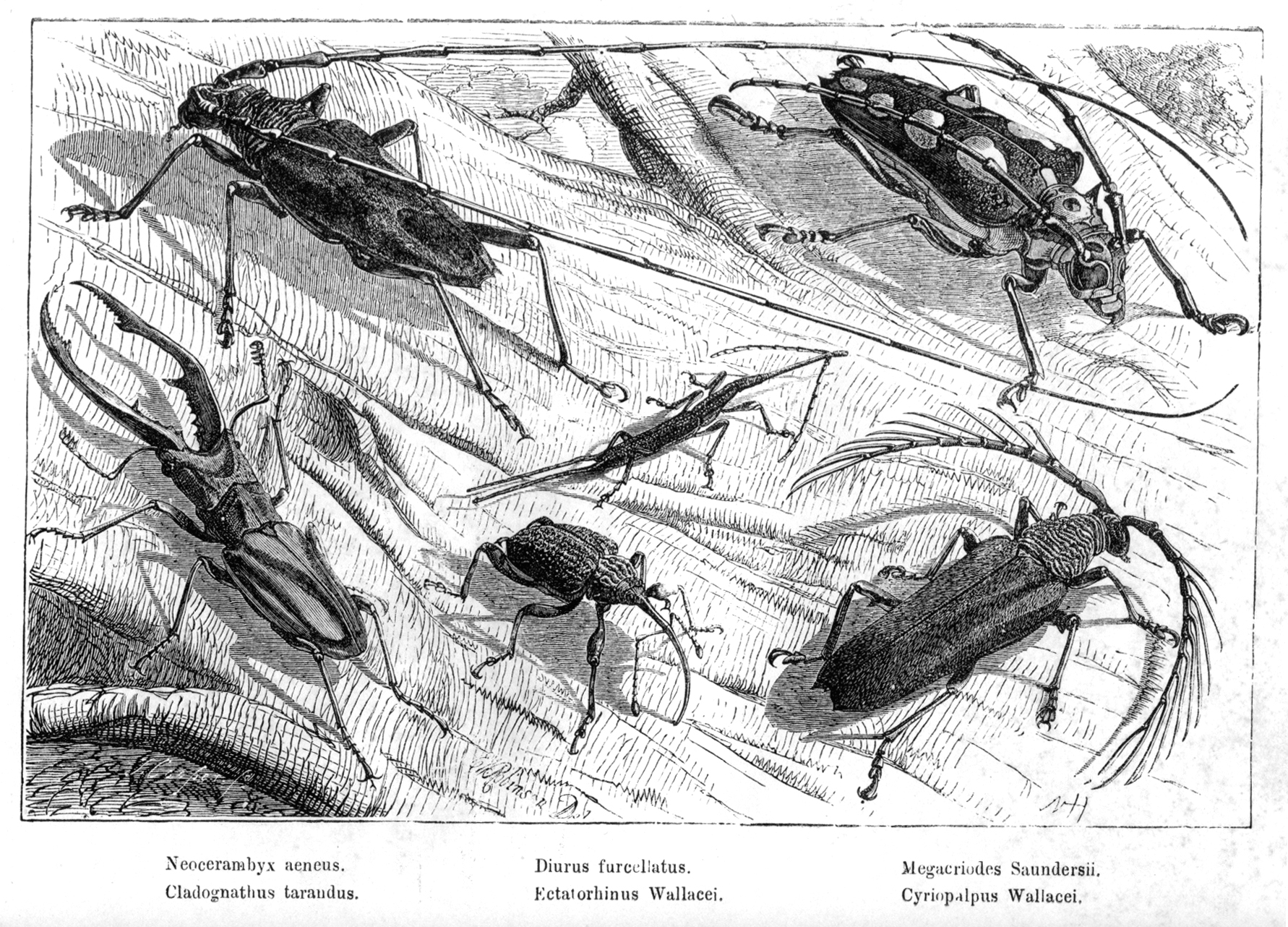
"Remarkable Beetles Found at Simunjon, Borneo". (Note: The plate was labelled "Neocerambyx æneas, Cladognathus tarandus, Diurus furcellatus, Ectatorhinus Wallacei, Megacriodes Saundersii, Cyriopalpus Wallacei".) A few of the 2,000 species of beetle collected by Alfred Russel Wallace in Borneo

Beetle collecting became extremely popular in the Victorian era. The naturalist Alfred Russel Wallace collected (by his own count) a total of 83,200 beetles during the eight years described in his 1869 book The Malay Archipelago, including 2,000 species new to science.

=== As inspiration for technologies ===
Several coleopteran adaptations have attracted interest in biomimetics with possible commercial applications. The bombardier beetle's powerful repellent spray has inspired the development of a fine mist spray technology, claimed to have a low carbon impact compared to aerosol sprays. Moisture harvesting behavior by the Namib desert beetle (Stenocara gracilipes) has inspired a self-filling water bottle which utilises hydrophilic and hydrophobic materials to benefit people living in dry regions with no regular rainfall.

Living beetles have been used as cyborgs. A Defense Advanced Research Projects Agency funded project implanted electrodes into Mecynorhina torquata beetles, allowing them to be remotely controlled via a radio receiver held on its back, as proof-of-concept for surveillance work. Similar technology has been applied to enable a human operator to control the free-flight steering and walking gaits of Mecynorhina torquata as well as graded turning, backward walking and feedback control of Zophobas morio.

=== In conservation ===
Since beetles form such a large part of the world's biodiversity, their conservation is important, and equally, loss of habitat and biodiversity is essentially certain to impact on beetles. Many species of beetles have very specific habitats and long life cycles that make them vulnerable. Some species are highly threatened while others are already feared extinct. Island species tend to be more susceptible as in the case of Helictopleurus undatus of Madagascar which is thought to have gone extinct during the late 20th century. Conservationists have attempted to arouse a liking for beetles with flagship species like the stag beetle, Lucanus cervus, and tiger beetles (Cicindelidae). In Japan the Genji firefly, Luciola cruciata, is extremely popular, and in South Africa the Addo elephant dung beetle offers promise for broadening ecotourism beyond the big five tourist mammal species. Popular dislike of pest beetles, too, can be turned into public interest in insects, as can unusual ecological adaptations of species like the fairy shrimp hunting beetle, Cicindis bruchi.

== See also ==
- Beetle Monuments

== Sources ==
- Evans, Arthur V.; Bellamy, Charles (2000). An Inordinate Fondness for Beetles. University of California Press. ISBN 978-0-520-22323-3.
- McHugh, Joseph V.; Liebherr, James K. (2009). "Coleoptera". Encyclopedia of Insects. pp. 183–201. doi:10.1016/B978-0-12-374144-8.00062-X. ISBN 978-0-12-374144-8.
