= List of Bledius species =

This is a list of 104 species in the genus Bledius.

== Bledius species ==
- Bledius actitus (Herman, 1972)
- Bledius adamus Scudder, 1878
- Bledius albonotatus Mäklin, 1853
- Bledius analis LeConte, 1863
- Bledius annularis LeConte, 1863
- Bledius aquilonarius Herman, 1976
- Bledius assimilis Casey, 1889
- Bledius aurantius Herman, 1983
- Bledius basalis LeConte, 1863
- Bledius beattyi Blackwelder, 1943
- Bledius bellicus Blackwelder, 1944
- Bledius bicolor Casey, 1889
- Bledius breretoni Hatch, 1957
- Bledius caribbeanus Blackwelder, 1943
- Bledius cedarensis Hatch, 1957
- Bledius ceratus Blackwelder, 1943
- Bledius clarus Fall, 1901
- Bledius cognatus LeConte, 1877
- Bledius confusus LeConte, 1877
- Bledius consimilis Fall, 1910
- Bledius cordatus (Say, 1831)
- Bledius coulteri Hatch, 1957
- Bledius cribricollis Heer, 1839
- Bledius cubensis Blackwelder, 1943
- Bledius diagonalis LeConte, 1863
- Bledius dimidiatus LeConte, 1877
- Bledius emarginatus (Say, 1831)
- Bledius episcopalis Fall, 1910
- Bledius eximius Casey, 1889
- Bledius faecorum Scudder, 1900
- Bledius fasciatus (Say, 1823)
- Bledius fenyesi Bernhauer & Schubert, 1911
- Bledius fergussoni Joy, 1912
- Bledius ferratus LeConte, 1877
- Bledius flavipennis LeConte, 1863
- Bledius foraminosus Casey, 1889
- Bledius forcipatus LeConte, 1863
- Bledius fortis LeConte, 1877
- Bledius fumatus LeConte, 1863
- Bledius gallicus (Gravenhorst, 1806)
- Bledius gentilis Casey, 1889
- Bledius glaciatus Scudder, 1890
- Bledius gracilis Casey, 1889
- Bledius gravidus Casey, 1889
- Bledius habrus Herman, 1983
- Bledius honestus Casey, 1889
- Bledius ineptus Casey, 1889
- Bledius jacobinus LeConte, 1877
- Bledius jamaicensis Blackwelder, 1943
- Bledius jucundus Herman, 1983
- Bledius laticollis LeConte, 1877
- Bledius litoreus (Herman, 1972)
- Bledius longipennis Mäklin, 1852
- Bledius mandibularis Erichson, 1840
- Bledius melanocephalus (Say, 1823)
- Bledius melanocolus Herman, 1983
- Bledius monstratus Casey, 1889
- Bledius monticola Casey, 1889
- Bledius mysticus Fall, 1910
- Bledius naius Herman, 1983
- Bledius nardus Herman, 1983
- Bledius nebulosus Casey, 1889
- Bledius neglectus Casey, 1889
- Bledius newelli Hatch, 1957
- Bledius nitidiceps LeConte, 1877
- Bledius nitidicollis LeConte, 1863
- Bledius notialus Herman, 1976
- Bledius omega Herman, 1983
- Bledius opacifrons LeConte, 1877
- Bledius opaculus LeConte, 1863
- Bledius opacus (Block, 1799)
- Bledius osborni Scudder, 1900
- Bledius pallipennis (Say, 1823)
- Bledius parvicollis Casey, 1889
- Bledius persimilis Fall, 1910
- Bledius philadelphicus Fall, 1919
- Bledius phytosinus LeConte, 1877
- Bledius playanus (Herman, 1972)
- Bledius politus Erichson, 1840
- Bledius primitiarum Scudder, 1900
- Bledius punctatissimus LeConte, 1877
- Bledius rotundicollis LeConte, 1877
- Bledius rubiginosus Erichson, 1840
- Bledius ruficornis LeConte, 1863
- Bledius semiferrugineus LeConte, 1863
- Bledius sinuatus LeConte, 1877
- Bledius soli Scudder, 1900
- Bledius spectabilis Kraatz, 1857
- Bledius stabilis Casey, 1889
- Bledius strenuus Casey, 1889
- Bledius susae Herman, 1983
- Bledius suturalis LeConte, 1863
- Bledius tallaci Fall, 1910
- Bledius tarandus Herman, 1970
- Bledius tau LeConte, 1877
- Bledius thinopus Herman, 1976
- Bledius turbulentus Casey, 1889
- Bledius turgidus Casey, 1889
- Bledius venus Herman, 1983
- Bledius villosus Casey, 1889
- Bledius viriosus Herman, 1983
- Bledius washingtonensis Hatch, 1957
- Bledius wudus Herman, 1983
- Bledius zophus Herman, 1983
