= Scolt Head Island =

Offshore barrier island between Brancaster and Wells-next-the-Sea in north Norfolk

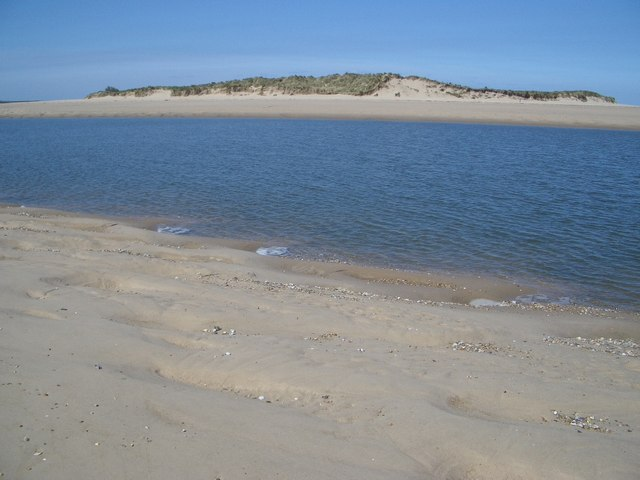
- From Gun Hill

- Location within Norfolk

Geography
- Coordinates: 52.9822°N 0.7066°E

Administration
- England
- Region: Norfolk
- County: King's Lynn and West Norfolk

Scolt Head Island is an offshore barrier island between Brancaster and Wells-next-the-Sea in north Norfolk. It is in the parish of Burnham Norton and is accessed by a ferry running all year called Welcome from the village of Overy Staithe. The shingle and sand island appears to have originated from a former spit extending from the coast, and longshore drift means that it is slowly moving to the west and inshore.

The island comprises sand dunes, salt marsh, intertidal sand and mud flats, and shingle. It supports internationally important numbers of breeding Sandwich and little terns, and nationally significant populations of common and Arctic terns, as well as wintering waders and wildfowl. It has a number of uncommon plants adapted to its harsh environments. It was bought by the National Trust in 1923, and became a national nature reserve. It was subsumed into the North Norfolk Coast SSSI in 1986. The larger area is now additionally protected through Natura 2000, Special Protection Area (SPA) and Ramsar listings, and is part of the Norfolk Coast Area of Outstanding Natural Beauty. The first resident first "watcher" (warden) on Scolt Head was pioneering ornithologist and photographer Emma Turner.

This isolated island has been largely undisturbed by human activity apart from service as an artillery range in World War II, and it is of international importance because of the extensive research into its geomorphology over nearly a century.

== Description ==
Scolt Head Island is a roughly 6.5 km (4 mi) long shingle and sand island on the Norfolk coast opposite Burnham Norton. Despite its name, it is possible to walk across the mudflats and Norton Creek to the island at low tide. However this route is potentially dangerous due to shifting and deep mud and rapid tidal changes, and is not recommended by the landowner. Its main beach and ridge of sand dunes run approximately east to west, and it has a series of curved shingle "hooks" running south and east on its landward side. The 737 ha (1820 acres) island is composed almost entirely of flint pebbles, mostly rounded by wave action, and sand; other minerals make up less than one per cent of the material. It is gradually extending westwards due to wave action and longshore drift. The curved shingle ridges were formed when each in turn was formerly the western end of the island, and salt marshes have developed between each ridge. Some of the shorter side ridges meet the main ridge at a steep angle due to the southward movement of the latter.

Natural England's designation document states that the shingle spits here and at Blakeney Point are of special importance for the study of geophysical processes, and are the best studied and documented in the world. The salt marsh and shingle structures together are of the highest national importance for investigating the recent geological history of this coast. The salt marshes here develop rapidly due to the inflow of silt and increasing plant growth, increasing in height by about 1 cm (0.4 in) annually, and developing a well-defined creek system as they age.

The island is served by a ferry from Burnham Overy Staithe which runs from April to September, and there is a 1 km (1,100 yd) nature trail with information boards.

== History ==
Norfolk has a long history of human occupation dating back to the Palaeolithic, and including significant archaeology. Both modern and Neanderthal people were present in the area between 100,000 and 10,000 years ago, before the last glaciation, and humans returned as the ice retreated northwards. The archaeological record is poor until about 20,000 years ago, partly because of the then prevailing very cold conditions, but also because the coastline was much further north than at present. As the ice retreated during the Mesolithic (10,000–5,000 BCE), the sea level rose, filling what is now the North Sea. This brought the Norfolk coastline much closer to its present line, so that many ancient sites are now under the sea in an area now known as Doggerland. Early Mesolithic flint tools with characteristic long blades up to 15 cm (5.9 in) long found on the present-day coast at nearby Titchwell Marsh date from a time when it was 60–70 km (37–43 mi) from the sea. Other flint tools have been found dating from the Upper Paleolithic (50,000–10,000 BCE) to the Neolithic (5,000–2,500 BCE). Deposits of peat between layers of marine or salt marsh sediments date from 1980–1780 BC, indicating that the sea had retreated, leaving this area as dry land during that era. Signs of human use of the island range from early medieval Grimston ware pottery to post-World War II building foundations, and wooden structures in the marshes include posts set for mussel farming, and a wooden structure that was probably a fish trap

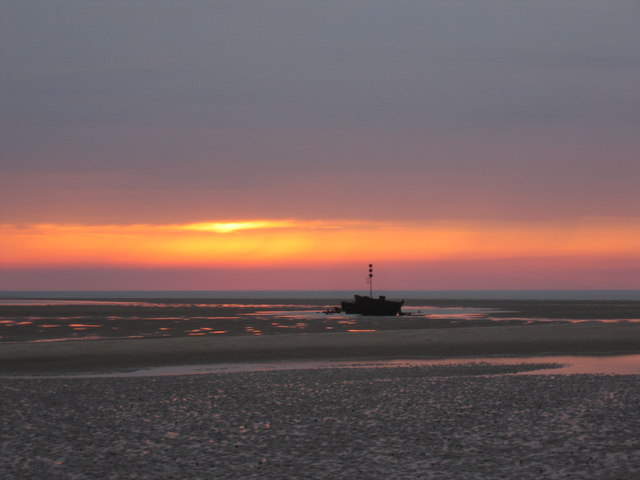
The wreck of the SS Vina at sunset

It was originally thought that the island, believed to be 2–3 thousand years old, developed from an offshore shingle ridge, and had thus always been an island, but current thinking is that the island was originally a spit extending west from Holkham dunes. Support for this theory comes from boreholes and from radiocarbon dating of a shell to 837AD, that appeared to indicate the existence of saltmarshes behind the shingle barrier at that time. A 1585 map also appears to show a spit at this location, and a 1630 inventory of the lands of Robert of Brancaster, the local Lord of the manor, did not list the island as a separate entity.

On the death of Simms Reeve, Lord of Brancaster, in 1922, earlier disputes over the ownership of the island were resolved with his executors retaining the southern part, and the Earl of Orford the northern section. The island was bought by the Earl of Leicester in 1922. He sold most of the island to the National Trust in 1923 for £500 to manage as a nature reserve, retaining only a small area at the eastern end. The first resident first "watcher" (warden) on Scolt Head was Emma Turner, who served for eighteen months in 1923–1924. In 1944, Lord Leicester was asked if he would remove five huts on his part of the island, together with others on the coast opposite. He agreed to do so if the Norfolk Naturalists' Trust (NNT) would take over his part of the island. The island was used as an artillery range during World War II, but the NNT purchase took place in 1945.

The SS Vina, an 1894 cargo steamer, was anchored near the west end of the island in 1944 for use as an RAF target where the wreck can still be seen at low tide. The remains of a Blenheim bomber were found at the north of the island in 2004. A steel wreck or hulk measuring around 72m long and 15m wide was also brought to the island during World War II for military target practice.

The Nature Conservancy Council took over responsibility for Scolt Head Island's management in 1953 on a 99-year lease, and it became a national nature reserve in 1967, It was subsumed into the newly created 7,700-hectare (19,000-acre) North Norfolk Coast SSSI in 1986. The larger area is now additionally protected through Natura 2000, Special Protection Area (SPA) and Ramsar listings, and is part of the Norfolk Coast Area of Outstanding Natural Beauty.

== Fauna and flora ==
=== Birds ===
Internationally important numbers of Sandwich and little terns breed on the island, together with common and Arctic terns The marshes also support wintering wildfowl and waders, including shelduck, wigeon, teal and curlew. brent geese feed on sea lettuce and eelgrass, preferring the former when both are available. The average number of pink-footed geese in the five winters to 2009/10 was 22,764, far exceeding the international importance level of 2,700 birds.

The island's location means that migrants may be found, sometimes in huge numbers when the weather conditions are right. These may include vagrant rarities, such as an isabelline shrike in 2003, a white-billed diver in 2002, and a dusky warbler in 2000.

=== Other animals and plants ===
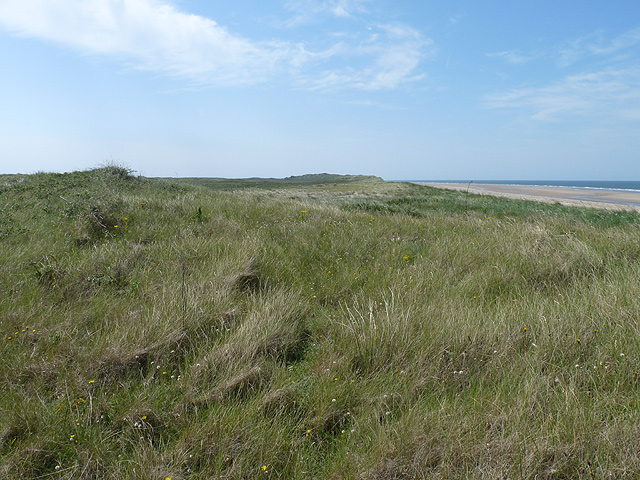
Marram grass-covered dunes

The rabbit population reached eight to ten thousand individuals before the arrival of myxomatosis in 1954 killed all but 12 animals, although numbers increased afterwards. Further outbreaks of the disease have led to fluctuating numbers of rabbits on the island. Other resident mammals include stoats, common shrews, pygmy shrews, wood mice and short-tailed voles. Three species of deer have travelled over the marshes to reach the island.

Insects include the intertidal ground beetle Dicheirotrichus gustavii which emerges from cracks or holes to feed on the salt marshes after dusk. Despite living in a coastal environment, it has no cycle of behaviour linked to the tides, simply scurrying for dry land when caught by the approaching sea. Another intertidal beetle, Bledius spectabilis, shows very unusual behaviour for an insect in that it actively protects its larvae from the parasitic wasp Barycnemis blediator and from the predatory Dicheirotrichus gustavi.

The saltmarsh and the dunes both hold a notably wide range of plants, including a number of uncommon species. The saltmarsh contains glassworts and common cord grass in the most exposed regions, with a succession of plants following on as the marsh becomes more established: first sea aster, then mainly sea lavender, with sea purslane in the creeks and smaller areas of sea plantain and other common marsh plants. The shingle ridges attract biting stonecrop, sea campion, yellow horned poppy, sea thrift, bird's foot trefoil and sea beet. sea wormwood, sea lavender and scrubby sea-blite also thrive, matted sea lavender and sea heath are international important species found in this habitat.

The sand dunes are initially stabilised by marram grass and sea couch grass, enabling colonisation by sea poa grass, sand couch-grass, lyme-grass and grey hair-grass, which also help to bind the sand. Sea holly, sand sedge, bird’s-foot trefoil and pyramidal orchid are other specialists of this arid habitat.

== Recreation ==
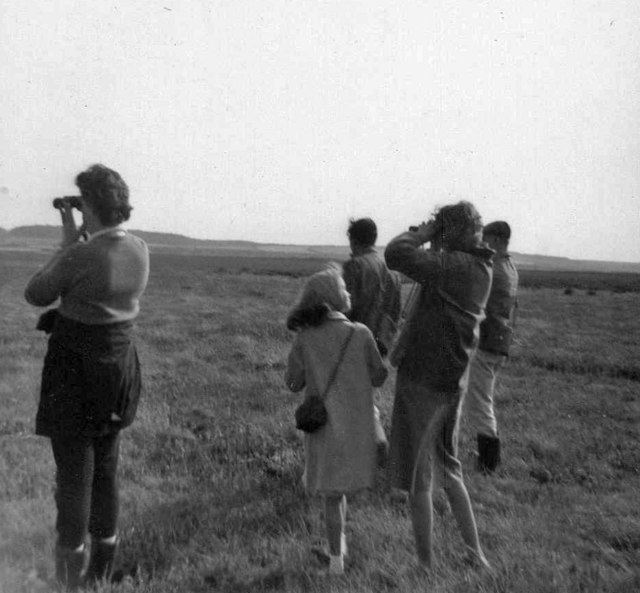
Birdwatchers in 1961

Outdoor recreation is important to the economy of north Norfolk, and a 2005 survey at six coastal sites found that 39 per cent of visitors gave birdwatching as the main purpose of their visit. The 7.7 million day visitors and 5.5 million who made overnight stays in the area in 1999 are estimated to have spent £122 million, and created the equivalent of 2,325 full-time jobs. The large number of visitors at coastal sites sometimes has negative effects. Wildlife may be disturbed, a frequent difficulty for species that breed in exposed areas such as ringed plovers and little terns, and also for wintering geese. Plants can be trampled, which is a particular problem in sensitive habitats such as sand dunes and vegetated shingle.

The limited access to the island means that it is not subjected to the pressures of heavy or uncontrolled visitor access. The Norfolk Coast Partnership, a grouping of conservation and environmental bodies, divide the coast and its hinterland into three zones for tourism development purposes. Similar dune systems at Blakeney Point, Holme and Holkham are considered to be sensitive habitats already suffering from visitor pressure, and therefore designated as a red-zone area with no development or parking improvements to be recommended, but Scolt is placed in the orange zone, for locations with fragile habitats but less tourism pressure.

== Threats ==
Storms in 1931–33 swept away 250 m (250 yd) of the island, and the island was breached in a large storm in 1938 and by the North Sea flood of January 1953, in each case washing the shingle through to the marshes beyond. A wire and brushwood fence erected in the spring of 1953 trapped sand and allowed the breach to heal by August of the same year.

== Secondary sources ==
- Allen, J R L; Pye, K (1992). Saltmarshes; morphodynamics, conservation and engineering significance. Cambridge: Cambridge University Press. ISBN 9780521418416.
- Allison, Hilary; Morley, John, eds. (1989). Blakeney Point and Scolt Head Island. Norwich: National Trust. ISBN 0951471708.
- Chorley, Richard J; Schumm, Stanley A; Sugden, David E (1984). Geomorphology. London: Methuen. ISBN 0416325904.
- Elkins, Norman (1988). Weather and Bird Behaviour. Waterhouses, Staffordshire: Poyser. ISBN 0-85661-051-8.
- Haines, Catherine M C (2001). International Women in Science: A Biographical Dictionary to 1950. Santa Barbara, California: ABC-CLIO. ISBN 1576070905.
- Holt, Chas; Austin, Graham; Calbrade, Neil; Mellan, Heidi; Mitchell, Carl; Stroud, David; Wotton, Simon; Musgrove, Andy (2011). Waterbirds in the UK 2009/10: The Wetland Bird Survey. Thetford, Norfolk: British Trust for Ornithology, Royal Society for the Protection of Birds and Joint Nature Conservation Committee. ISBN 978-1-906204-33-4.
- Liley, D (2008). Development and the north Norfolk coast. Scoping document on the issues relating to access (PDF). Wareham, Dorset: Footprint Ecology. Archived from the original (PDF) on 31 August 2012.
- Murphy, Peter (2009). The English coast: a history and a prospect. London: Continuum International Publishing. ISBN 978-1-84725-143-5.
- Newton, Ian (2010). Bird Migration: Collins New Naturalist Library. London: Collins. ISBN 0-00-730732-2.
- Packham, J.R.; Willis, A J (1997). Ecology of Dunes, Salt Marsh and Shingle. London: Chapman & Hall. ISBN 0412579804.
- Robertson, David; Crawley, Peter; Barker, Adam; Whitmore, Sandrine (2005). Norfolk Archaeological Unit Report No. 1045: Norfolk Rapid Coastal Zone Archaeological Survey (PDF). Norwich: Norfolk Archaeological Unit. Archived (PDF) from the original on 2 August 2011.
- Rodgers, Christopher P; Straighten, Eleanor; Winchester, Angus J L; Pieraccini, Margherita (2010). Contested common land: environmental governance past and present. London: Routledge. ISBN 1849710945.
- Scott Wilson Ltd (2006). "Tourism benefit & impacts analysis in the Norfolk coast Area of Outstanding Natural Beauty" (PDF). Norwich: Norfolk Coast Partnership. Archived from the original (PDF) on 7 February 2016.
- Shennan, Ian; Andrews, J (2000). Holocene Land-ocean Interaction and Environmental Change Around the North Sea. London: Geological Society. ISBN 1862390541.
- Steers, J. A. (1976) [1964]. Blakeney Point and Scolt Head Island. Norwich: National Trust.
