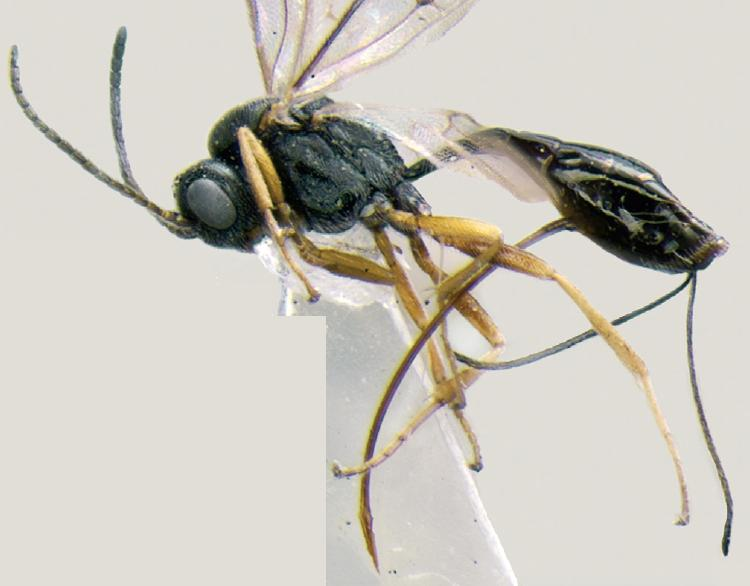
- Tersilochus runatus

Scientific classification
- Kingdom: Animalia
- Phylum: Arthropoda
- Clade: Pancrustacea
- Class: Insecta
- Order: Hymenoptera
- Family: Ichneumonidae
- Subfamily: Tersilochinae; Schmiedeknecht,1910

= Tersilochinae =

Subfamily of wasps

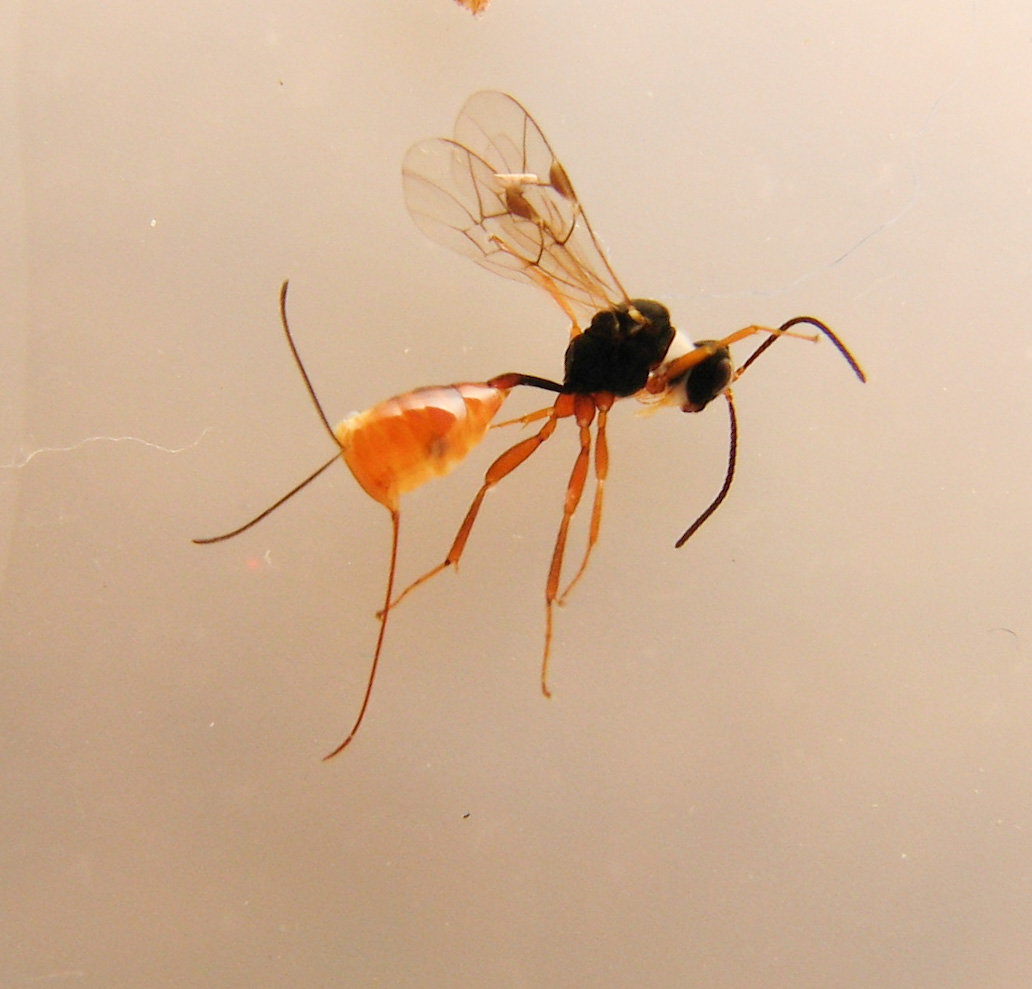
Tersilochinae

Tersilochinae is a worldwide subfamily of the parasitic wasp family Ichneumonidae.

Tersilochinae species are koinobiont endoparasitoids of Coleoptera larvae, (although Symphyta larvae are recorded as hosts of one genus). Hosts include Curculionidae and Chrysomelidae so Tersilochinae are used for biological control. There are currently 24 genera and 500 species.

== Genera ==
- Allophroides Horstmann, 1971
- Allophrys Förster, 1869
- Aneuclis Förster, 1869
- Areyonga Gauld, 1984
- Australochus Khalaim, 2004
- Barycnemis Förster, 1869
- Ctenophion Horstmann, 2010
- Diaparsis Förster, 1869
- Epistathmus Förster, 1869
- Gelanes Horstmann, 1981
- Heterocola Förster, 1869
- Horstmannoloehus Gauld, 1984
- Labilochus Khalaim, 2017
- Megalochus Khalaim & Broad, 2013
- Meggoleus Townes, 1971
- Palpator Khalaim, 2006
- Petiloehus Gauld, 1984
- Phradis Förster, 1869
- Probles Förster, 1869
- Sathropterus Förster, 1869
- Spinolochus Horstmann, 1971
- Stethantyx Townes, 1971
- Tersilochus Holmgren, 1859
- Zealochus Khalaim, 2004
