= Common sea-heath =

Common sea-heath is a common name for several plants and may refer to:

- Frankenia laevis, native to Europe and northern Africa
- Frankenia pauciflora, native to Australia
