= Areyonga =

Areyonga may refer to:

- Areyonga, a genus of prehistoric fishes, synonym of Areyongalepis
- Areyonga (insect), a genus of insects in the family Ichneumonidae
- Areyonga, Northern Territory, a community in Australia
  - Areyonga School, a school at Areyonga
