= Phrudinae =

Former subfamily of wasps

Phrudinae was formerly a subfamily of the wasp family Ichneumonidae. As a result of recent research, Phrudinae is no longer accepted as a valid subfamily, and its member genera have been moved to the subfamilies Brachycyrtinae and Tersilochinae.
