= Aneuclis =

Scientific classification
- Kingdom: Animalia
- Phylum: Arthropoda
- Clade: Pancrustacea
- Class: Insecta
- Order: Hymenoptera
- Family: Ichneumonidae
- Subfamily: Tersilochinae
- Genus: Aneuclis; Förster, 1869

Type species
- Isurgus rufipes (= Thersilochus maritimus Thomson, 1889) Szépligeti, 1899

Species
- See text

Genus of parasitic wasps

Aneuclis, also known as the Aneuclis Förster is a genus of the parasitic wasp family Ichneumonidae that was discovered by Arnold Förster in 1869. It's species are typically geographically grouped into Palaeartic, Afrotropical, Nearctic and Oriental.

It is distributed across Cameroon, Namibia, South Africa, Zimbabwe, the Palaearctic region and, Tanzania.

The wasp belongs to the informal genus group Diaparsis (note this is separate to the formal genus Diaparsis) along with the genera Diaparsis and Sathropterus.

== History ==
The genus was originally thought to be only found in Palaeartic regions but, as more were found in other areas, the Afrotropical classification was later added. However, 10 out of the 35 species have been discovered since 2009 (exclusive) creating a necessity for the additional, unofficial subtypes; Nearartic and, Oriental. These subtypes were known previously, although they were undescribed prior to 2012 at the finding of the Aneuclis secunda.

== Description ==
All species under Aneuclis are for the most part uniform however there are some distinguishing features between the subcategories such as varying flaggellum length with Afrotropical having 14-15 and Palaerctic having 13-23. Most species have a body length of 2.5-3.0mm, notably small compared to other parasitic wasps.

== Species ==
- Aneuclis achterbergi (Khalaim, 2018)
- Aneuclis aciculifera (Khalaim, 2004)
- Aneuclis anterior (Horstmann, 1971)
- Aneuclis aenigmatica (Khalaim & Ruíz-Cancino, 2019)
- Aneuclis atra (Khalaim, 2004)
- Aneuclis brevicauda (Thomson, 1889)
- Aneuclis denticauda (Khalaim, 2005)
- Aneuclis devriesi (Khalaim, 2018)
- Aneuclis flavopedes (Sheng, Zhou & Wei, 2020)
- Aneuclis horstmanni (Khalaim, 2004)
- Aneuclis incidens (Thomson, 1889)
- Aneuclis interstitialis (Horstmann, 2012)
- Aneuclis laminosa (Khalaim, 2009)
- Aneuclis lanternaria (Khalaim, 2009)
- Aneuclis larga (Khalaim, 2009)
- Aneuclis lasciva (Khalaim, 2009)
- Aneuclis lugubris (Khalaim, 2009)
- Aneuclis luteola (Khalaim, 2004)
- Aneuclis maritima (Thomson, 1889)
- Aneuclis melanaria (Holmgren, 1860)
- Aneuclis minutissima (Khalaim, 2005)
- Aneuclis mongolica (Khalaim, 2004)
- Aneuclis obscura (Horstmann, 2012)
- Aneuclis petiolaris (Horstmann, 2012)
- Aneuclis rhodesiana (Khalaim, 2010)
- Aneuclis rufipleuris (Horstmann, 1980)
- Aneuclis rufula (Horstmann, 2012)
- Aneuclis secunda (Khalaim, 2011)
- Aneuclis semeonovnae (Khalaim, 2004)
- Aneuclis stepposa (Khalaim, 2004)
- Aneuclis stigmata (Khalaim, 2004)
- Aneuclis tarbagataica (Khalaim, 2004)
- Aneuclis unica (Khalaim, 2004)
- Aneuclis vannoorti (Khalaim, 2009)
