= Philadelphicus =

Philadelphicus may refer to:

- Bledius philadelphicus, species of rove beetle
- Proctacanthus philadelphicus, species of robber flies
- Rubus philadelphicus, species of bramles
- Vireo philadelphicus, species of songbird
