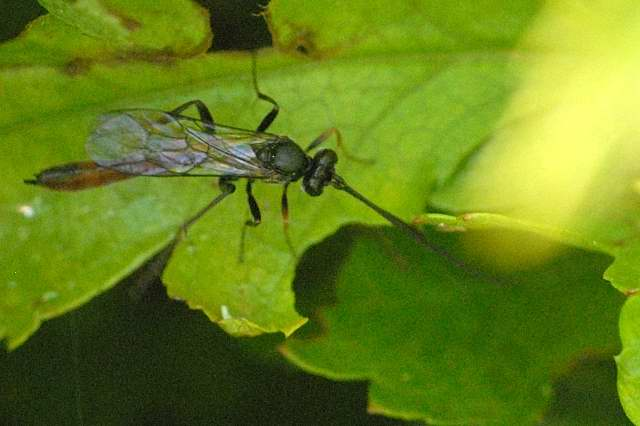
- Barycnemis harpura

Scientific classification
- Domain: Eukaryota
- Kingdom: Animalia
- Phylum: Arthropoda
- Class: Insecta
- Order: Hymenoptera
- Family: Ichneumonidae
- Subfamily: Tersilochinae
- Genus: Barycnemis; Förster, 1869

= Barycnemis =

Genus of wasps

Barycnemis is a genus of parasitoid wasps belonging to the family Ichneumonidae. Host species include the genera Byrrhus, Bledius, and Pissodes.

The genus was first described by Förster in 1869.

The species of this genus are found in Europe and North America.

Species:

- Barycnemis alpina
- Barycnemis asiatica
- Barycnemis bellator
- Barycnemis blediator
- Barycnemis confusa
- Barycnemis deserta
- Barycnemis dissimilis
- Barycnemis frigida
- Barycnemis gracillima
- Barycnemis gravipes
- Barycnemis harpura
- Barycnemis sugonyaevi
- Barycnemis suspecta
- Barycnemis tamaulipeca
- Barycnemis tarsator
- Barycnemis terminator
- Barycnemis tibetica
- Barycnemis tlaxcala
- Barycnemis tobias
