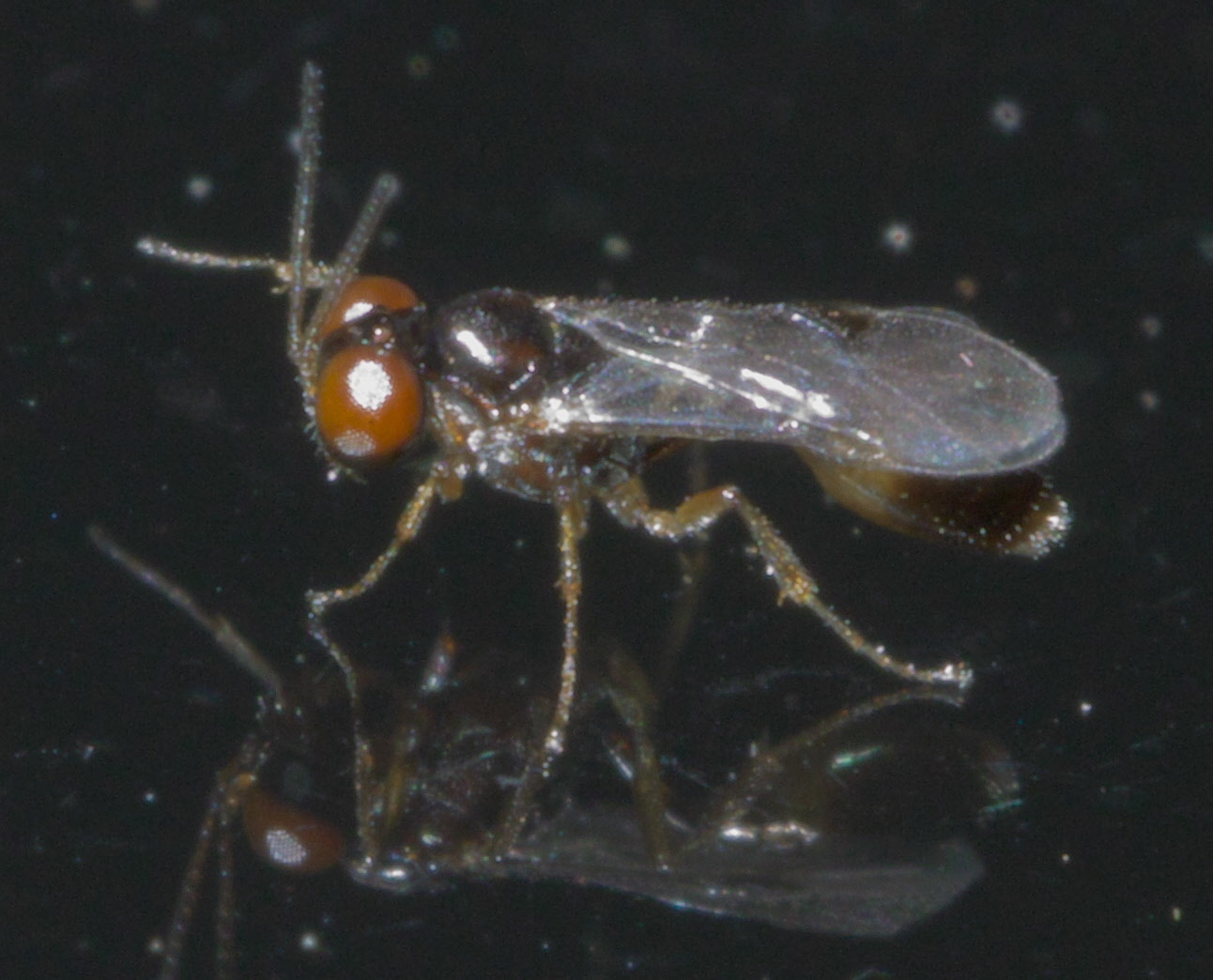

Scientific classification
- Kingdom: Animalia
- Phylum: Arthropoda
- Clade: Pancrustacea
- Class: Insecta
- Order: Hymenoptera
- Family: Ichneumonidae
- Subfamily: Tersilochinae
- Genus: Allophroides; Horstmann, 1971

Type species
- Porizon boops Gravenhorst, 1829

Species
- See text

= Allophroides =

Genus of wasps

Allophroides is a genus of the parasitic wasp family Ichneumonidae. The type species is Allophroides boops.

== Species ==
- Allophroides acutatus Khalaim, 2007
- Allophroides boops (Gravenhorst, 1829)
- Allophroides flavilabris Horstmann, 2013
- Allophroides granulatus Horstmann, 2013
- Allophroides laevipleuris Horstmann, 2013
- Allophroides obscurus Horstmann, 2013
- Allophroides platyurus (Strobl, 1904)
- Allophroides rufifemur Horstmann, 1971
- Allophroides rufobasalis Horstmann et Kolarov, 1988
- Allophroides salicicola Horstmann, 2013
- Allophroides tenuicauda Horstmann, 2013
- Allophroides ungularis (Horstmann, 1981)
