= Bledius fenyesi =

Scientific classification
- Domain: Eukaryota
- Kingdom: Animalia
- Phylum: Arthropoda
- Class: Insecta
- Order: Coleoptera
- Suborder: Polyphaga
- Infraorder: Staphyliniformia
- Family: Staphylinidae
- Genus: Bledius
- Species: B. fenyesi

Binomial name
- Bledius fenyesi Bernhauer & Schubert, 1911

Species of beetle

Bledius fenyesi is a species of insect in the subfamily Oxytelinae (spiny-legged rove beetles) and in the family Staphylinidae. It is found in Central America and North America.
