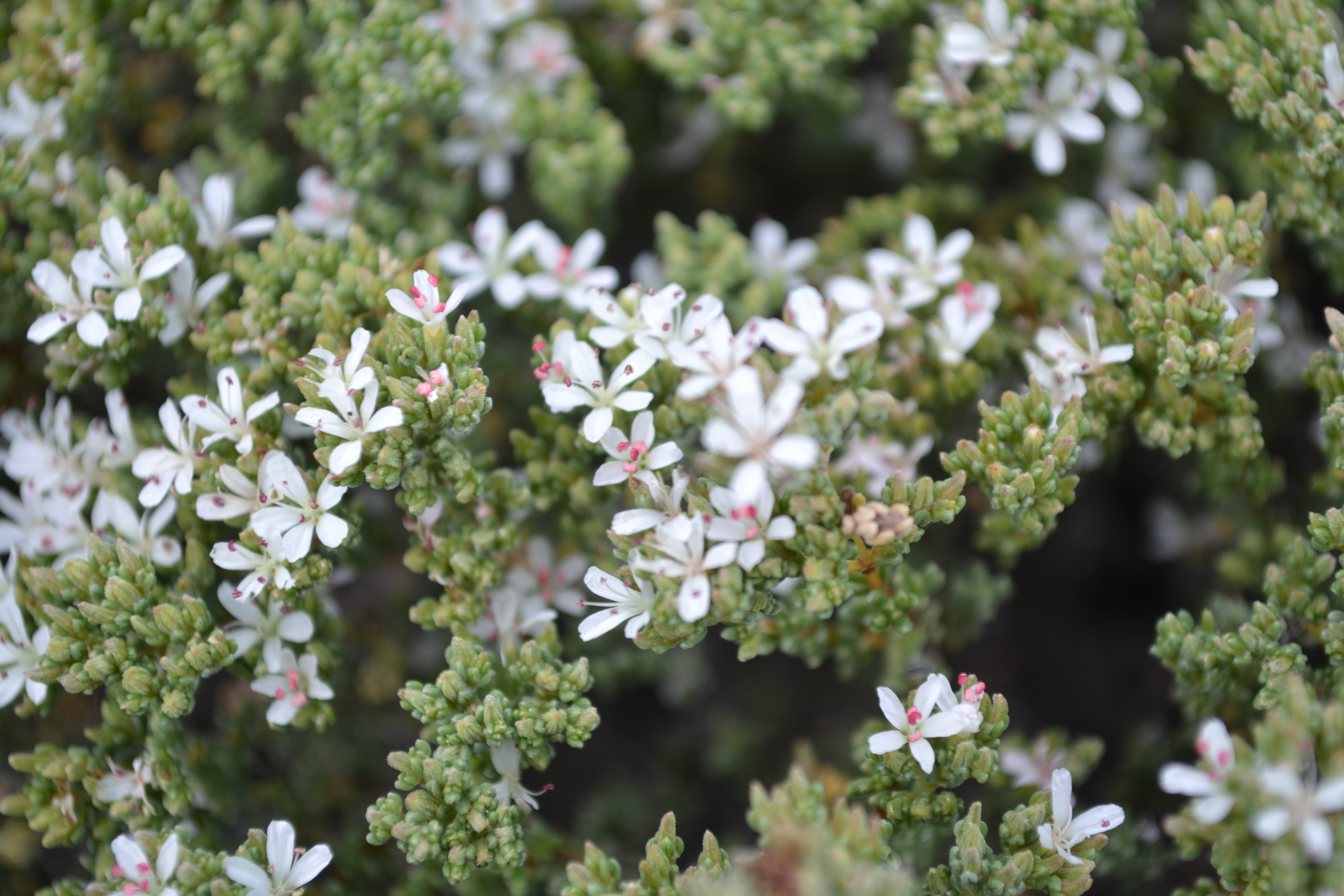

Conservation status
- Vulnerable (NatureServe)

Scientific classification
- Kingdom: Plantae
- Clade: Tracheophytes
- Clade: Angiosperms
- Clade: Eudicots
- Order: Caryophyllales
- Family: Frankeniaceae
- Genus: Frankenia
- Species: F. palmeri

Binomial name
- Frankenia palmeri S.Wats.

= Frankenia palmeri =

Species of flowering plant

Frankenia palmeri is a species of flowering plant in the frankenia family, Frankeniaceae, known by the common name Palmer's seaheath, Palmer's frankenia, or yerba reuma. It is native to the coastline of northwestern Mexico, as well as San Diego County, California, in the United States. It is a plant of sand dunes, beaches, alkali flats, and salt marshes, where it thrives due to its adaptation to saline soils. This is a small, tangling shrub less than a meter tall with spreading stems lined with clusters of knobby, fleshy leaves. Toward the ends of branches flowers appear among the leaf clusters. Each flower has white petals 3 or 4 millimeters long, often washed with pink toward the throat and with pink anthers. The plant is becoming increasingly rare as its habitat on valuable coastal land is consumed for development.
