= Bledius ferratus =

Scientific classification
- Kingdom: Animalia
- Phylum: Arthropoda
- Class: Insecta
- Order: Coleoptera
- Suborder: Polyphaga
- Infraorder: Staphyliniformia
- Family: Staphylinidae
- Genus: Bledius
- Species: B. ferratus

Binomial name
- Bledius ferratus LeConte, 1877

Species of beetle

Bledius ferratus is a species of spiny-legged rove beetle in the family Staphylinidae. It is found in Central America and North America.
