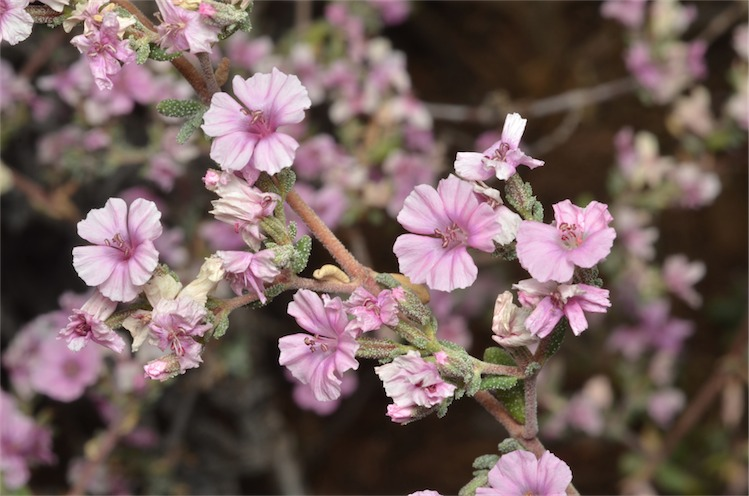

Scientific classification
- Kingdom: Plantae
- Clade: Tracheophytes
- Clade: Angiosperms
- Clade: Eudicots
- Order: Caryophyllales
- Family: Frankeniaceae
- Genus: Frankenia
- Species: F. serpyllifolia

Binomial name
- Frankenia serpyllifolia Lindl.

= Frankenia serpyllifolia =

Bristly sea-heath

Species of plant

Frankenia serpyllifolia commonly known as bristly sea-heath, is a flowering plant in the family Frankeniaceae and grows in New South Wales, South Australia, Queensland and the Northern Territory. It is a small, spreading shrub with pink flowers.

== Description ==
Frankenia serpyllifolia is a small, spreading herb to 30 cm (12 in) high and 50 cm (20 in) in diameter covered with short spreading hairs. The leaves are arranged opposite, 0.3–0.9 cm (0.12–0.35 in) long, 1–4 mm (0.039–0.157 in) wide, flat, exude salt, oval to oblong-shaped, flat or margins curved downward. The flowers are pink, mostly 5 petalled, petals 7–12 mm (0.28–0.47 in) long, borne singly at leaf axils or clusters of 2-70 flowers at the base of leaves or at the end of stems and the calyx 5–9 mm (0.20–0.35 in) long. Flowering occurs mostly in spring.

== Taxonomy and naming ==
Frankenia serpyllifolia was first formally described in 1848 by John Lindley and the description was published in Journal of an Expedition into the Interior of Tropical Australia. The specific epithet (serpyllifolia) means "wild thyme-leaved".

== Distribution and habitat ==
Bristly sea-heath grows on heavy soils or flood plains in South Australia, Queensland, New South Wales and the Northern Territory.
