= Bledius annularis =

Scientific classification
- Domain: Eukaryota
- Kingdom: Animalia
- Phylum: Arthropoda
- Class: Insecta
- Order: Coleoptera
- Suborder: Polyphaga
- Infraorder: Staphyliniformia
- Family: Staphylinidae
- Genus: Bledius
- Species: B. annularis

Binomial name
- Bledius annularis LeConte, 1863

Synonyms
- Bledius languidus Casey, 1889

Species of beetle

Bledius annularis, or ringed borrow rove beetle, is a species of spiny-legged rove beetle in the family Staphylinidae. It is found in North America.

The lectotype for this taxon from a male specimen, collected from Lake Superior, and is housed within the Museum of Comparative Zoology at Harvard University.

== Habitat and distribution ==
Within New Brunswick, B. annularis is characteristically known to frequent damp clay riverbanks and shaded streams.

A number of closely related species of Bledius are commonly grouped together and referred to as the "annularis complex", then further subdivided into the "annularis group". This 'complex' of difficult to distinguish species is distributed right across northern North America, and consists of B. annularis, B. breretoni, B. honestus, B. languidus, B.mysticus, B. nebulosus, B. sinuatus, B. stabilis, and B. washingtonensis.

== Description ==
The beetle is slender and elongate in appearance, measuring between 3.8 mm and 4.5 mm. Its head and thorax, as well as the tip of its abdomen are all black in colour, whilst the base of its abdomen, its elytra and its antennae are reddish-brown. Its legs are dark yellow. Its head is lightly granulate and also finely punctate. The thorax is not as wide as it is long, whilst the base of the abdomen is narrower than the elytra. The abdomen of this beetle sometimes appears slightly banded as a result of the hind margins of the upper (dorsal) segments being slightly darker in colour.
