= Australochus =

Scientific classification
- Kingdom: Animalia
- Phylum: Arthropoda
- Clade: Pancrustacea
- Class: Insecta
- Order: Hymenoptera
- Family: Ichneumonidae
- Subfamily: Tersilochinae
- Genus: Australochus; Khalaim, 2004
- Species: A. clypeator

Binomial name
- Australochus clypeator Khalaim, 2004

Genus of wasps

Australochus is a genus of the parasitic wasp family Ichneumonidae. It currently consists of only one species, Australochus clypeator.
