= Bledius analis =

Scientific classification
- Domain: Eukaryota
- Kingdom: Animalia
- Phylum: Arthropoda
- Class: Insecta
- Order: Coleoptera
- Suborder: Polyphaga
- Infraorder: Staphyliniformia
- Family: Staphylinidae
- Genus: Bledius
- Species: B. analis

Binomial name
- Bledius analis LeConte, 1863

Species of beetle

Bledius analis is a species of spiny-legged rove beetle in the family Staphylinidae. It is found in North America.
