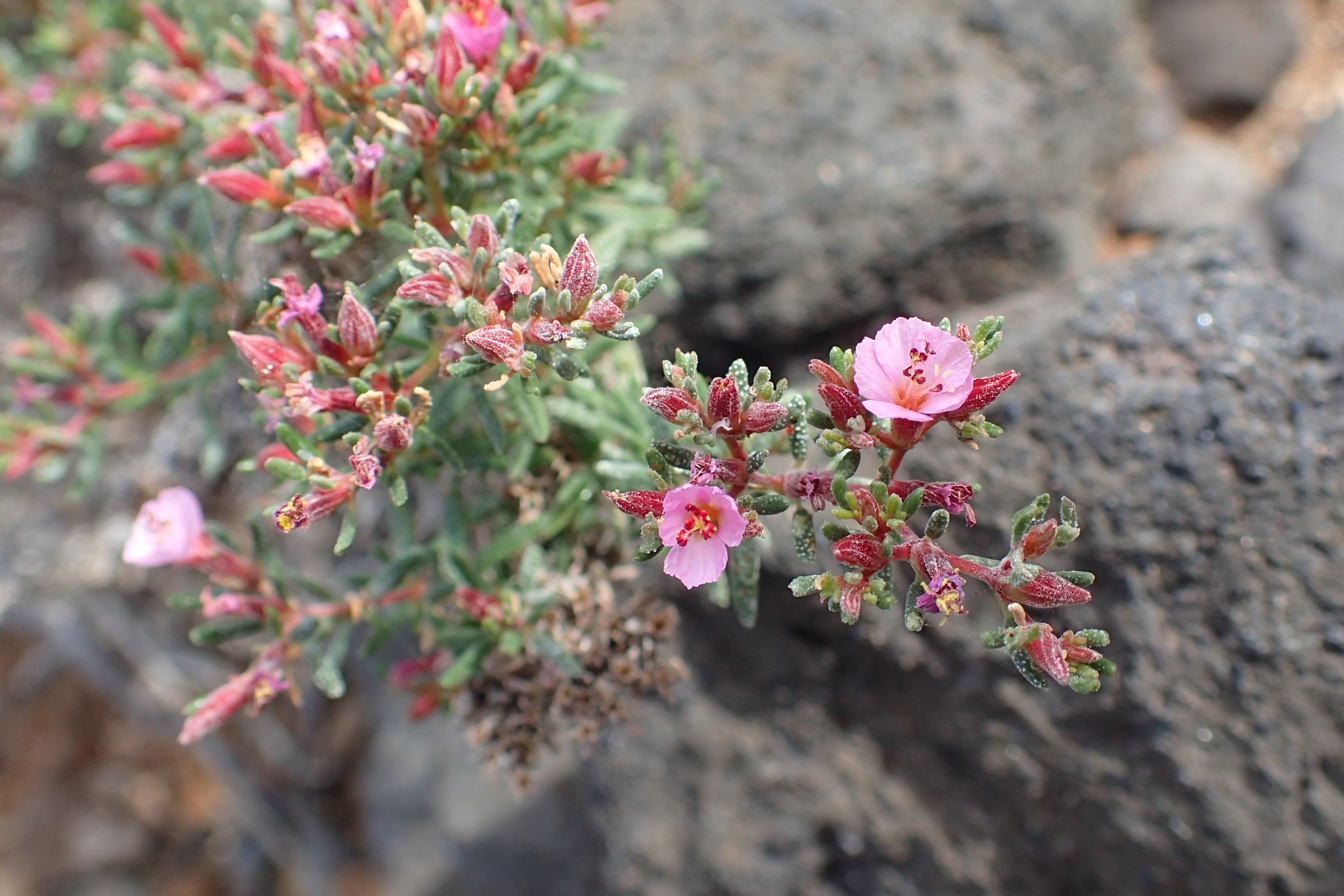

Scientific classification
- Kingdom: Plantae
- Clade: Tracheophytes
- Clade: Angiosperms
- Clade: Eudicots
- Order: Caryophyllales
- Family: Frankeniaceae
- Genus: Frankenia
- Species: F. pulverulenta

Binomial name
- Frankenia pulverulenta L.

= Frankenia pulverulenta =

Species of plant

Frankenia pulverulenta, the European seaheath, is a species of annual herb in the family Frankeniaceae. They have a self-supporting growth form and simple, broad leaves. Individuals can grow to 5 cm tall.

== Sources ==
This article incorporates text from a free content work. Licensed under CC0 (license statement/permission). Text taken from Frankenia pulverulenta. Encyclopedia of Life.
