= Frankenia fruticosa =

Scientific classification
- Kingdom: Plantae
- Clade: Tracheophytes
- Clade: Angiosperms
- Clade: Eudicots
- Order: Caryophyllales
- Family: Frankeniaceae
- Genus: Frankenia
- Species: F. fruticosa

Binomial name
- Frankenia fruticosa J.C.Manning & Helme, 2014

Species of flowering plant

Frankenia fruticosa is a species of Frankeniaceae native to Knersvlakte, South Africa. A woody shrub, it grows to a height of 35 cm. It has small, rough leaves and white flowers. It is most commonly found on the southern sides of the quartz covered slopes that typify the area.
