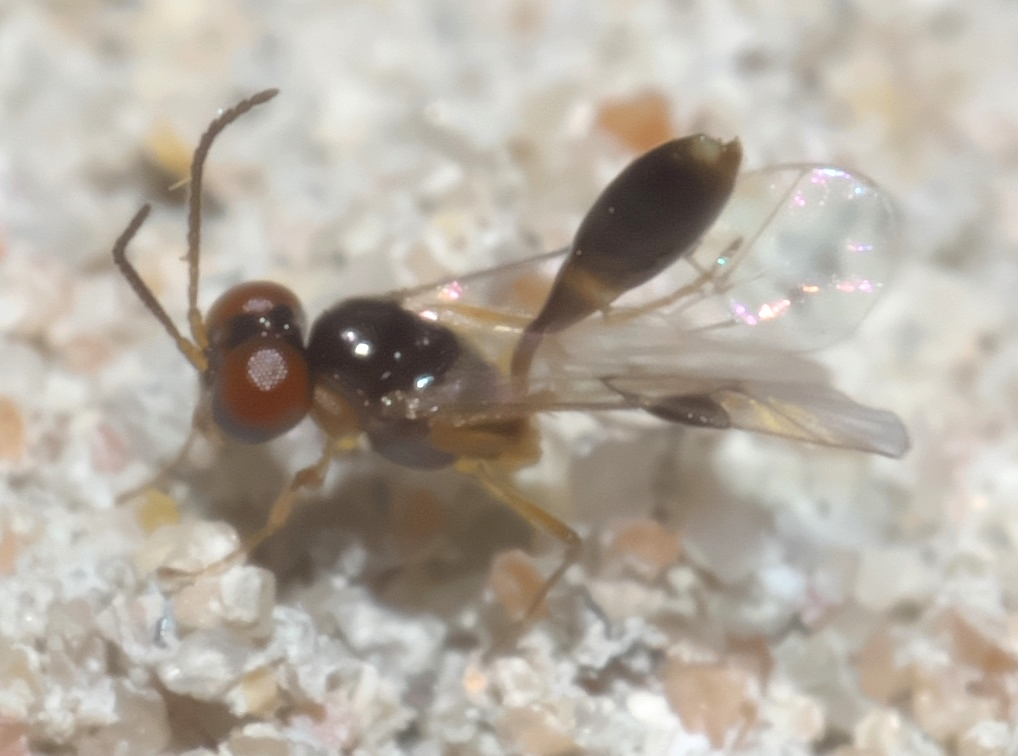
- Allophrys divaricata

Scientific classification
- Kingdom: Animalia
- Phylum: Arthropoda
- Clade: Pancrustacea
- Class: Insecta
- Order: Hymenoptera
- Family: Ichneumonidae
- Subfamily: Tersilochinae
- Genus: Allophrys; Förster, 1869

Type species
- Thersilochus oculatus Ashmead, 1895

Species
- See text

= Allophrys =

Genus of wasps

Allophrys is a genus of the parasitic wasp family Ichneumonidae.

== Species ==
- Allophrys astafurovae Khalaim, 2013
- Allophrys barycnemica Khalaim & Broad, 2012
- Allophrys bribria Khalaim & Broad, 2012
- Allophrys broadi Khalaim, 2013
- Allophrys bruneiensis Khalaim, 2011
- Allophrys budongoana Khalaim, 2013
- Allophrys calculator Khalaim, 2013
- Allophrys cantonensis Reshchikov & Yue, 2017
- Allophrys compressor Khalaim & Broad, 2012
- Allophrys dictator Khalaim, 2013
- Allophrys divaricata Horstmann, 2010
- Allophrys excavator Khalaim, 2013
- Allophrys granulata Khalaim, 2013
- Allophrys hansoni Khalaim & Broad, 2012
- Allophrys matsumurai Khalaim, 2017
- Allophrys megafrons Khalaim & Broad, 2012
- Allophrys meggoleuca Khalaim, 2017
- Allophrys noyesi Khalaim & Broad, 2012
- Allophrys occipitata Khalaim, 2011
- Allophrys oculata (Ashmead, 1895)
- Allophrys scitula Khalaim, 2013
- Allophrys takemotoi Khalaim, 2017
- Allophrys tractor Khalaim, 2013
- Allophrys townesi (Khalaim, 2007)

Allophrys falcatus Reshchikov, 2017 was transferred to the genus Microctonus.
