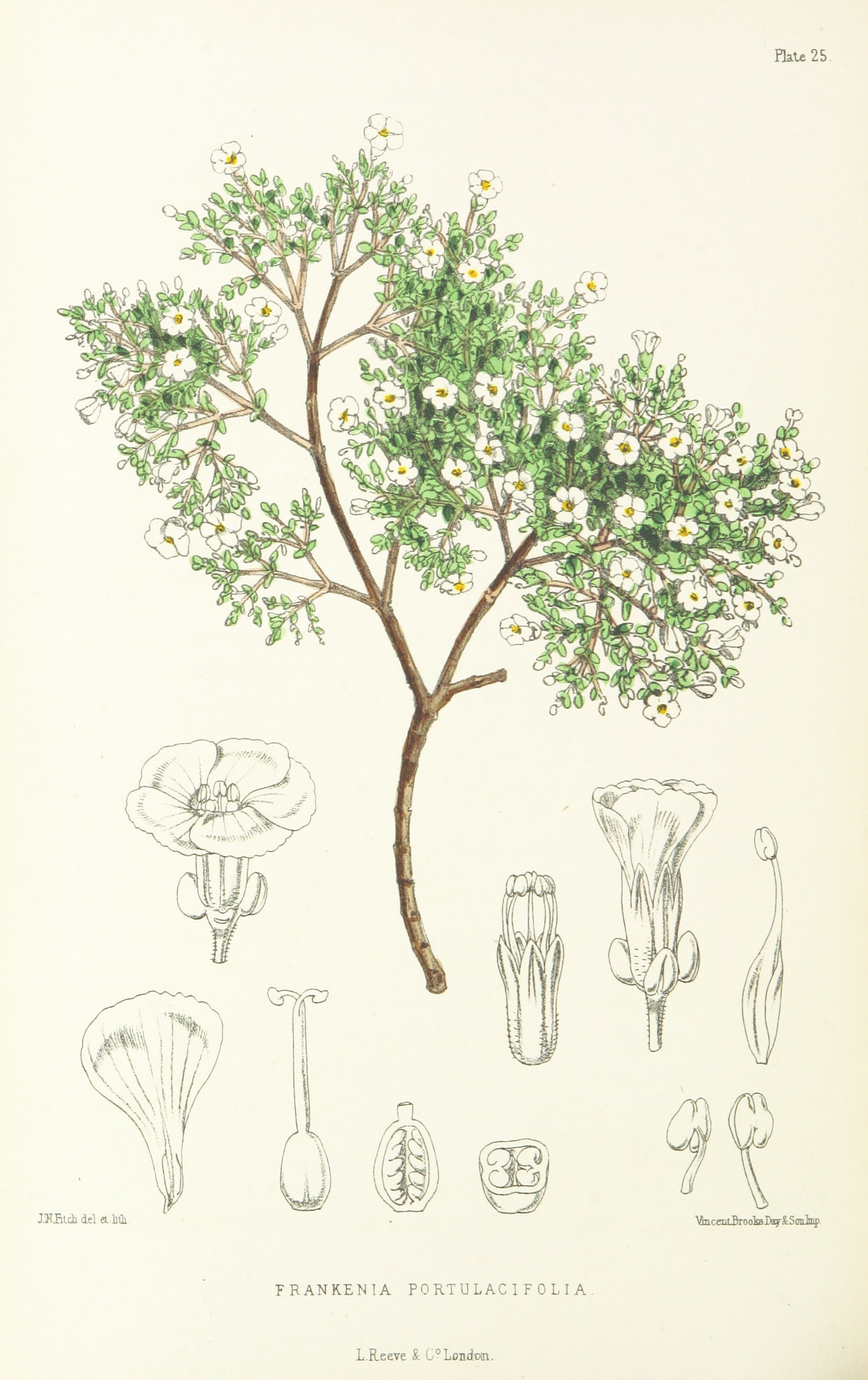

Conservation status
- Critically Endangered (IUCN 3.1)

Scientific classification
- Kingdom: Plantae
- Clade: Embryophytes
- Clade: Tracheophytes
- Clade: Spermatophytes
- Clade: Angiosperms
- Clade: Eudicots
- Order: Caryophyllales
- Family: Frankeniaceae
- Genus: Frankenia
- Species: F. portulacifolia

Binomial name
- Frankenia portulacifolia (Roxb.) Spreng.

Synonyms
- Beatsonia compacta Surgis; Beatsonia portulacifolia Roxb.; Frankenia beatsonia Schult. & Schult.f.

= Frankenia portulacifolia =

Species of flowering plant

Frankenia portulacifolia, also called Saint Helena tea or tea plant, is a species of salt-tolerant plant in the Frankeniaceae family. It is a subshrub or shrub endemic to the island of Saint Helena. Its natural habitats are inhospitable, dry and rocky areas and rocky shores, often on weathered volcanic ash. As its total population has been estimated at only around 3,500 individuals, it is currently classified as Critically Endangered by the IUCN.

The species was first described as Beatsonia portulacifolia by William Roxburgh in 1816. In 1825 Kurt Polycarp Joachim Sprengel placed the species in genus Frankenia as F. portulacifolia.
