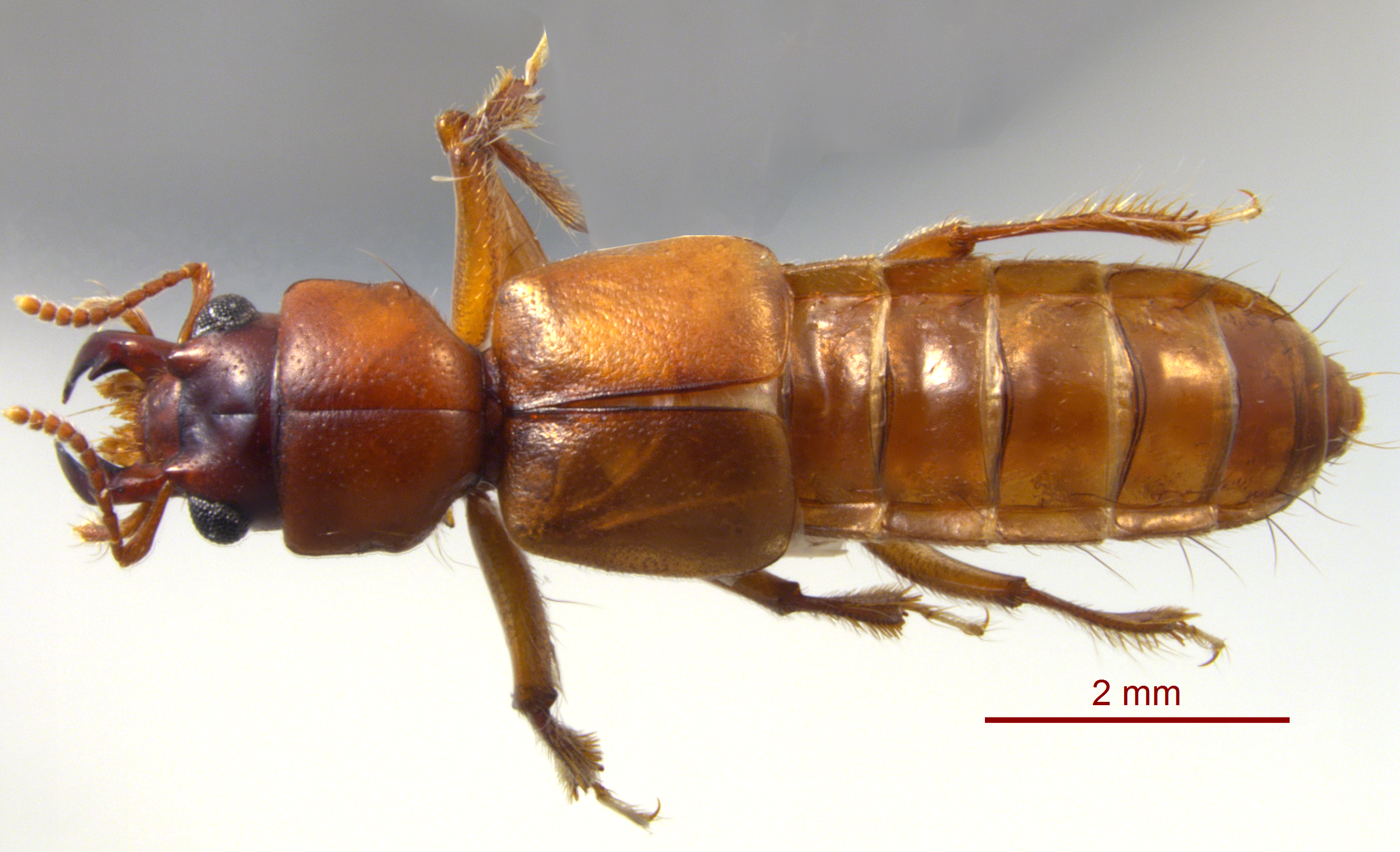

Scientific classification
- Kingdom: Animalia
- Phylum: Arthropoda
- Class: Insecta
- Order: Coleoptera
- Suborder: Polyphaga
- Infraorder: Staphyliniformia
- Family: Staphylinidae
- Genus: Bledius
- Species: B. mandibularis

Binomial name
- Bledius mandibularis Erichson, 1840

Synonyms
- Bledius brevidens LeConte, 1877

= Bledius mandibularis =

Species of beetle

Bledius mandibularis is a species of spiny-legged rove beetle in the family Staphylinidae. It is found in the Caribbean Sea and North America.
