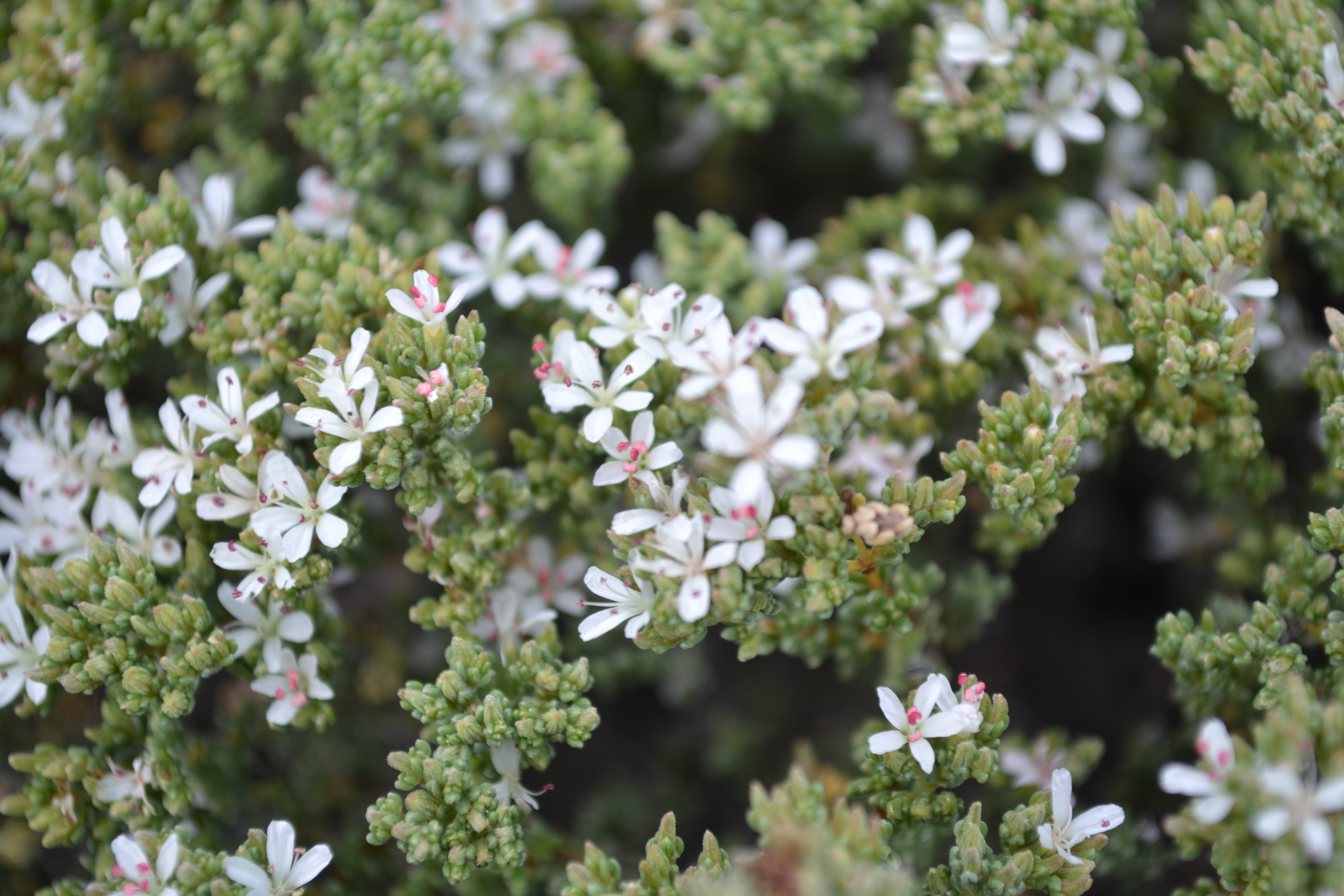
- Frankenia palmeri

Scientific classification
- Kingdom: Plantae
- Clade: Embryophytes
- Clade: Tracheophytes
- Clade: Spermatophytes
- Clade: Angiosperms
- Clade: Eudicots
- Order: Caryophyllales
- Family: Frankeniaceae; Desv.
- Genus: Frankenia; L.

Type species
- Frankenia laevis L.

Synonyms
- Anthobryum Phil.; Beatsonia Roxb.; Franca Boehm.; Hypericopsis Boiss.; Niederleinia Hieron.; Tetreilema Turcz.

= Frankenia =

Genus of flowering plants

Frankenia (sea heath) is the only genus in the Frankeniaceae family of flowering plants. Other genera have been recognized within the family, such as Anthobryum, Hypericopsis and Niederleinia, but molecular phylogenetic studies have consistently shown that they all belong inside Frankenia. Frankenia comprises about 70–80 species of shrubs, subshrubs and herbaceous plants, adapted to saline and dry environments throughout temperate and subtropical regions. A few species are in cultivation as ornamental plants.

== Description ==
Frankenia species are salt tolerant (halophytic) or drought tolerant (xerophytic) shrubs, subshrubs or herbaceous plants. They have opposite, simple leaves, generally small and somewhat heather-like, and often with salt-excreting glands in sunken pits. Their flowers are small, either solitary or borne in various kinds of cyme. Each flower has four to seven sepals, joined at the base into a tube, and four to seven overlapping petals, narrowed at the base. The stamens are often arranged in two whorls of three each. The ovary is made up of one to four carpels (usually three). The fruit is a capsule, enclosed in the persistent sepals. The seeds have a central embryo with considerable starchy endosperm on each side.

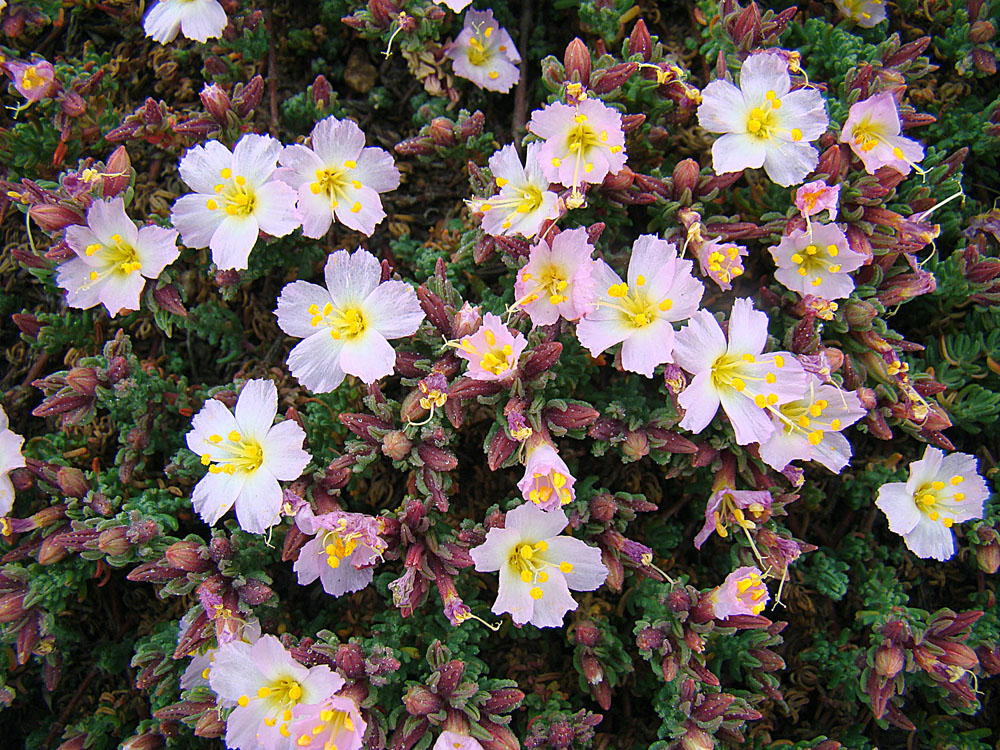
Flowers of Frankenia chilensis

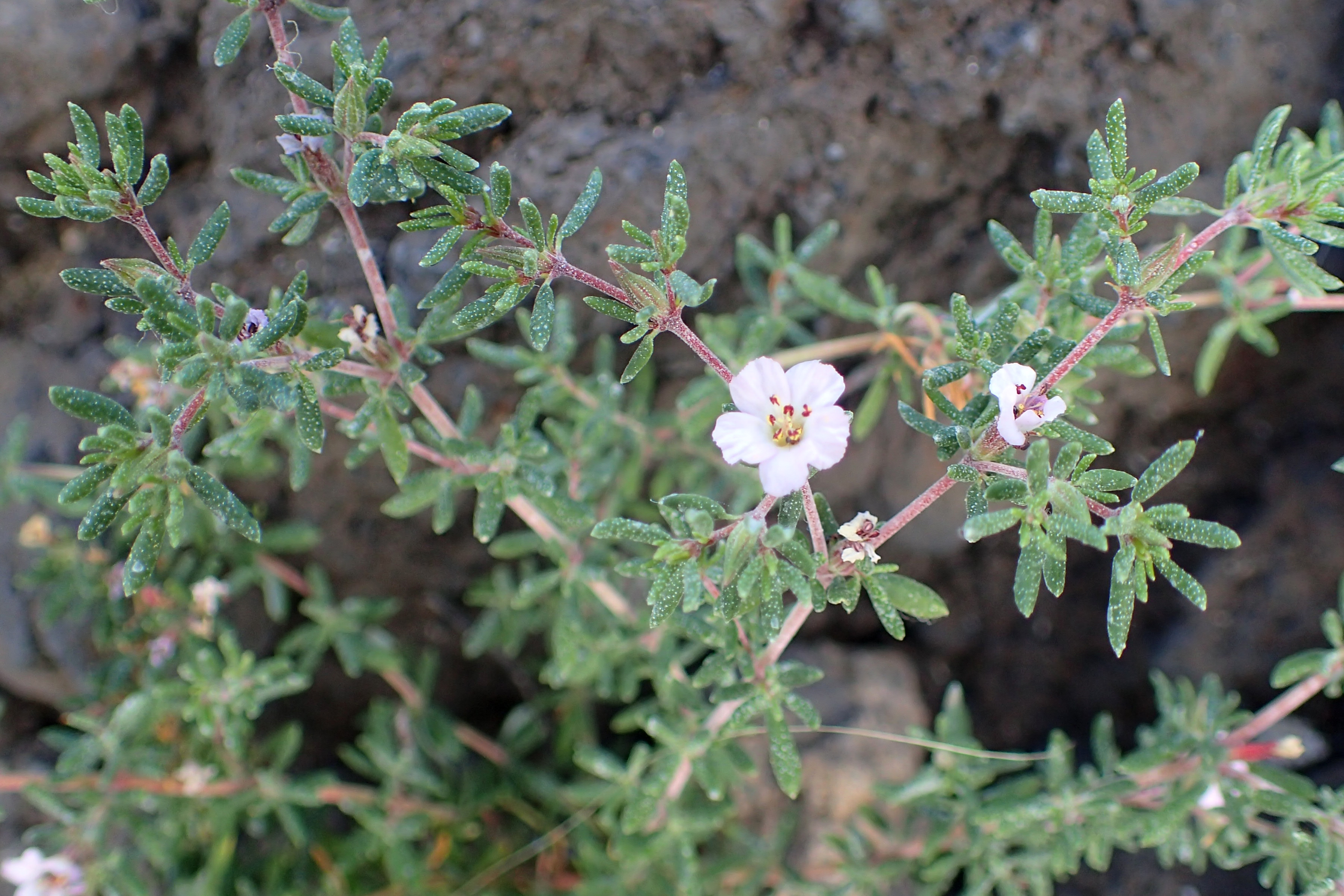
Salt glands on the leaves of Frankenia ericifolia

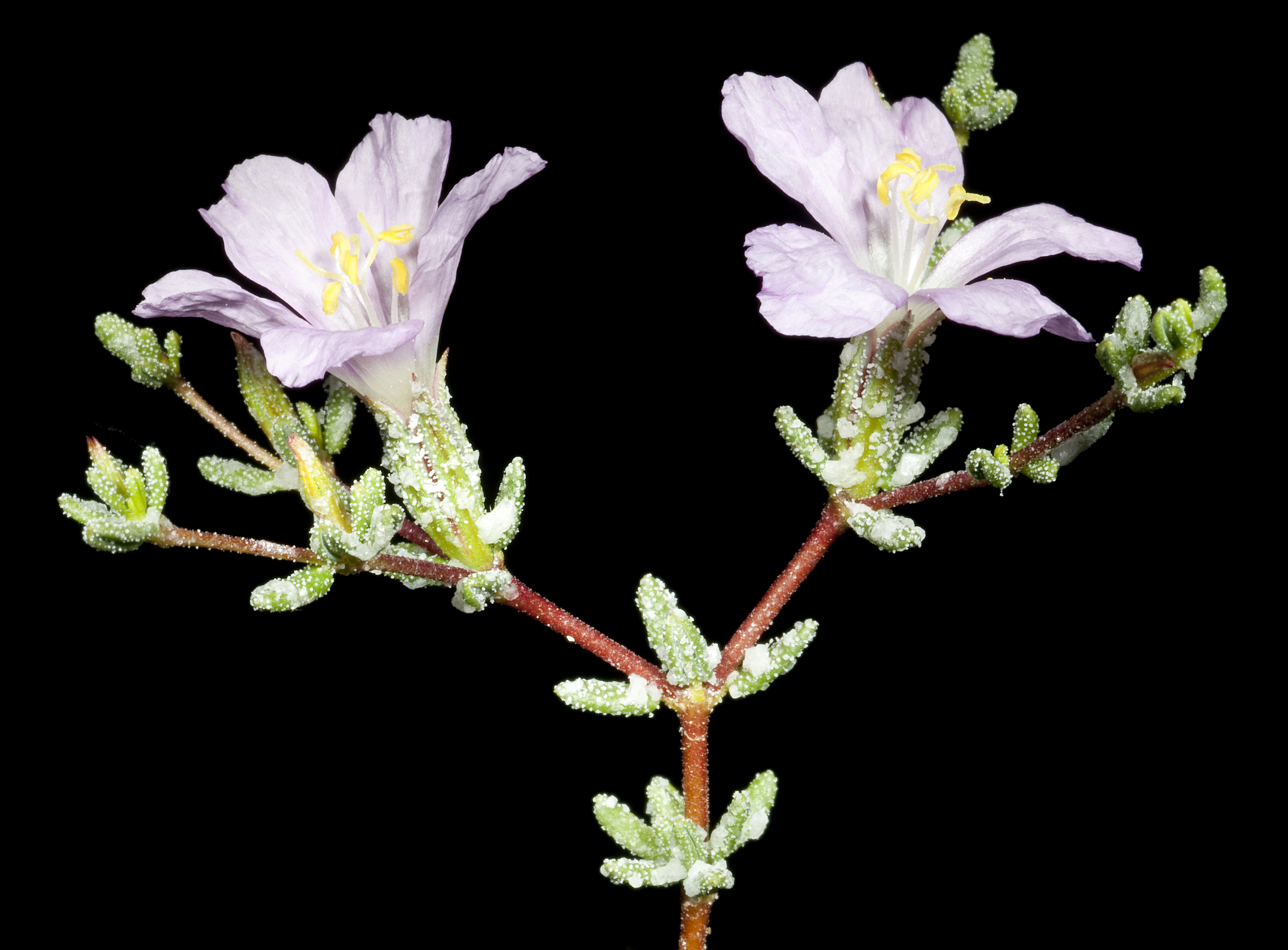
Frankenia pauciflora

== Taxonomy ==
The genus Frankenia was erected by Carl Linnaeus in 1753, with three species, the first named being Frankenia laevis. The genus name honours Johan Franck or Frankenius (1590–1661), a professor of botany at Uppsala, Sweden. Linnaeus initially used an artificial system to group genera (his systema sexuale). Later, he and other botanists adopted "natural" systems of classification, using orders or families. Augustin Saint-Hilaire in 1815 was the first to suggest, tentatively, that Frankenia might be the type of a new family. His suggestion was formalized in a publication edited by Nicaise Auguste Desvaux in 1817.

At least six genera have been recognized within the family Frankeniaceae at various times. Only Frankenia is accepted as of March 2018. Genera that have been recognized include Hypericopsis Boiss. (not Hypericopsis Opiz which is a synonym of Hypericum), Anthobryum and Niederleinia. Hypericopsis, with the sole species Hypericopsis persica, was still accepted by Klaus Kubitzki in 2003; however a morphological study published in the same year concluded that Hypericopis belonged in Frankenia. A molecular phylogenetic study in 2004 reached the same conclusion.

=== Phylogeny and classification ===
The family Frankeniaceae is placed in the order Caryophyllales in the APG IV system. A summary phylogenetic tree of the Caryophyllales shows that Frankeniaceae belongs outside the core Caryophyllales, and that its closest relationship is with the tamarisk family, Tamaricaceae.

- Caryophyllales
  - caryophyllids – core Caryophyllales
  - - mostly carnivorous families (Dioncophyllaceae, Ancistrocladaceae, Drosophyllaceae, Droseraceae, Nepenthaceae)
    - - - Polygonaceae
        - Plumbaginaceae
      - - Frankeniaceae
        - Tamaricaceae

Studies of the relationships within the genus have used a limited number of species. A cladogram for seven species suggests that Australian species may be more closely related to Eurasian and African species than to those from the Americas. (Note: Distributions via the accepted species list for Frankenia at Plants of the World Online.)

- - Frankenia salina – Chile, northern America
  - - - Frankenia jamesii – northern America
      - Frankenia johnstonii – northern America
    - - - Frankenia pauciflora – Australia
        - Frankenia serpylliflora – Australia
      - - Frankenia hirsuta – Eurasia, northern Africa
        - Frankenia persica – Iran

=== Species ===
As of March 2018, the following species were accepted by Plants of the World Online:

- Frankenia adpressa Summerh.
- Frankenia ambita Ostenf.
- Frankenia boissieri Reut. ex Boiss.
- Frankenia brachyphylla (Benth.) Summerh.
- Frankenia bracteata Turcz.
- Frankenia bucharica Basil.
- Frankenia capitata Webb & Berthel.
- Frankenia chevalieri Maire
- Frankenia chilensis C.Presl ex Schult. & Schult.f.
- Frankenia chubutensis Speg.
- Frankenia cinerea A.DC.
- Frankenia conferta Diels
- Frankenia confusa Summerh.
- Frankenia connata Sprague
- Frankenia cordata J.M.Black
- Frankenia corymbosa Desf.
- Frankenia crispa J.M.Black
- Frankenia cupularis Summerh.
- Frankenia decurrens Summerh.
- Frankenia densa Summerh.
- Frankenia desertorum Summerh.
- Frankenia drummondii Benth.
- Frankenia eremophila Summerh.
- Frankenia ericifolia C.Sm. ex DC.
- Frankenia fecunda Summerh.
- Frankenia fischeri Hicken
- Frankenia flabellata Sprague
- Frankenia foliosa J.M.Black
- Frankenia fruticosa J.C.Manning & Helme
- Frankenia georgei Diels
- Frankenia glomerata Turcz.
- Frankenia gracilis Summerh.
- Frankenia gypsophila I.M.Johnst.
- Frankenia hamata Summerh.
- Frankenia hirsuta L.
- Frankenia hispidula Summerh.
- Frankenia interioris Ostenf.
- Frankenia irregularis Summerh.
- Frankenia jamesii Torr. ex A.Gray
- Frankenia johnstonii Correll
- Frankenia juniperoides (Hieron.) M.N.Correa
- Frankenia laevis L.
- Frankenia latior Sprague & Summerh.
- Frankenia laxiflora Summerh.
- Frankenia leonardorum Alain
- Frankenia magnifica Summerh.
- Frankenia margaritae Medrano
- Frankenia microphylla Cav.
- Frankenia muscosa J.M.Black
- Frankenia orthotricha (J.M.Black) J.M.Black
- Frankenia pallida Boiss.
- Frankenia palmeri S.Watson
- Frankenia parvula Turcz.
- Frankenia patagonica Speg.
- Frankenia pauciflora DC.
- Frankenia persica (Boiss.) Jaub. & Spach
- Frankenia planifolia Sprague & Summerh.
- Frankenia plicata Melville
- Frankenia pomonensis Pohnert
- Frankenia portulacifolia (Roxb.) Spreng.
- Frankenia pseudoflabellata Summerh.
- Frankenia pulverulenta L.
- Frankenia punctata Turcz.
- Frankenia repens (P.J.Bergius) Fourc.
- Frankenia salina (Molina) I.M.Johnst.
- Frankenia salsuginea Adigüzel & Aytaç
- Frankenia scabra Lindl.
- Frankenia serpyllifolia Lindl.
- Frankenia sessilis Summerh.
- Frankenia setosa W.Fitzg.
- Frankenia stuartii Summerh.
- Frankenia subteres Summerh.
- Frankenia tetrapetala Labill.
- Frankenia thymifolia Desf.
- Frankenia triandra J.Rémy
- Frankenia tuvinica Lomon.
- Frankenia uncinata Sprague & Summerh.
- Frankenia vidalii Phil.

== Distribution and habitat ==
Frankenia has a widespread but patchy distribution throughout temperate and subtropical areas of the world, being absent from the tropics. In North America, it is found in Mexico and some western and southern states of the U.S. In South America, it also has a western and southern distribution. In Eurasia and Africa, it occurs around the Mediterranean Sea, the Black Sea and the Caspian Sea, extending northwards to Great Britain, southwards to South Sudan, and eastwards to India. It is also native to southern Africa and Australia. Frankenia species are halophytes (salt tolerant) and xerophytes (drought tolerant). They are found in coastal and arid regions.

== Cultivation ==
A few species of Frankenia are grown as ornamental plants, particularly in rock gardens and similar situations, where they can form spreading mats. Recommended species in the United Kingdom include F. hirsuta, F. laevis and F. thymifolia, all with white to rose purple flowers.
