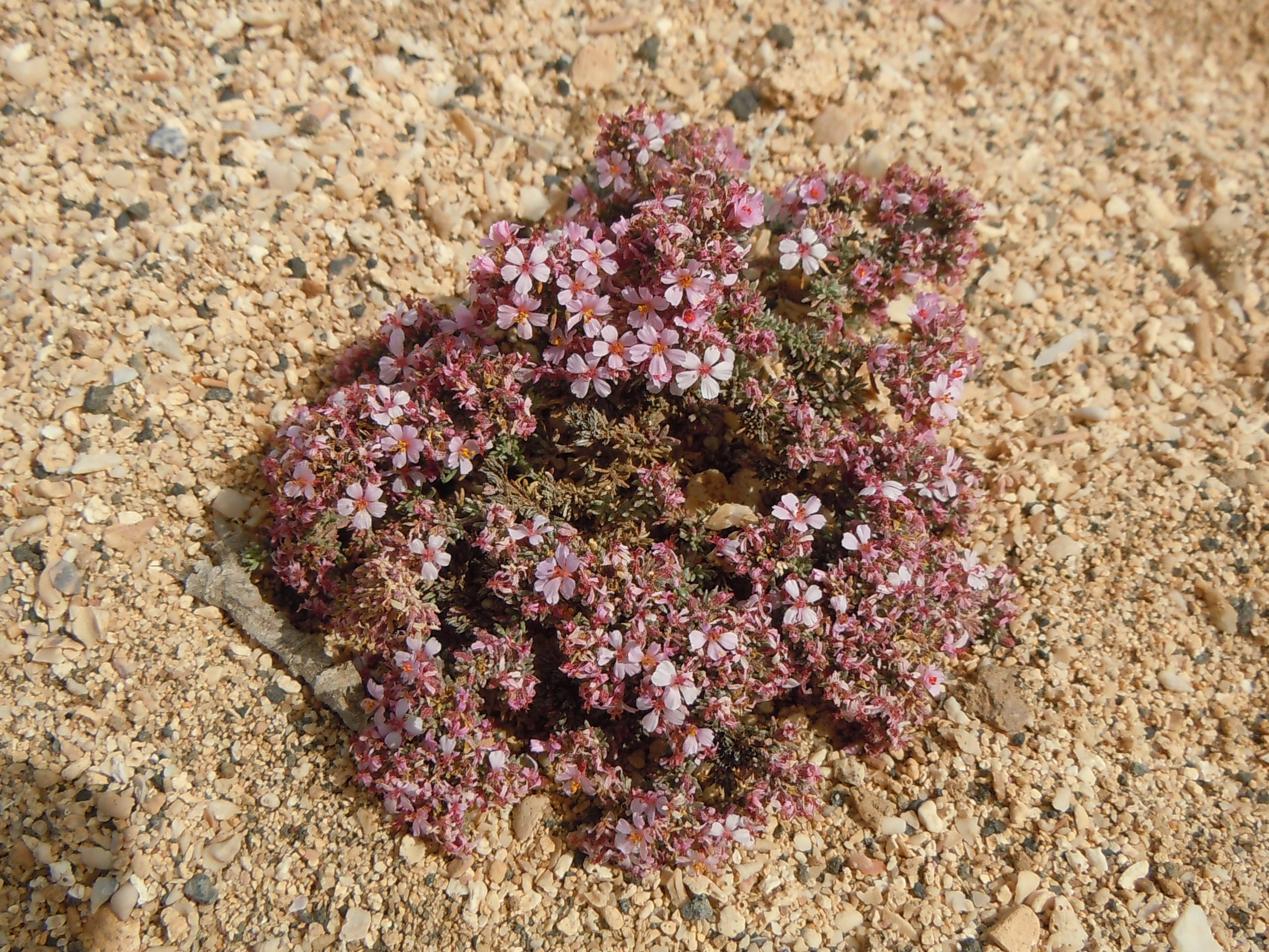
- In habitat in Lanzarote

Scientific classification
- Kingdom: Plantae
- Clade: Tracheophytes
- Clade: Angiosperms
- Clade: Eudicots
- Order: Caryophyllales
- Family: Frankeniaceae
- Genus: Frankenia
- Species: F. capitata

Binomial name
- Frankenia capitata Webb & Berthel.

Synonyms

= Frankenia capitata =

Species of flowering plant

Frankenia capitata is a species of flowering plant in the family Fabaceae, native to southern Macaronesia (the Canary Islands, Madeira and the Salvage Islands).
