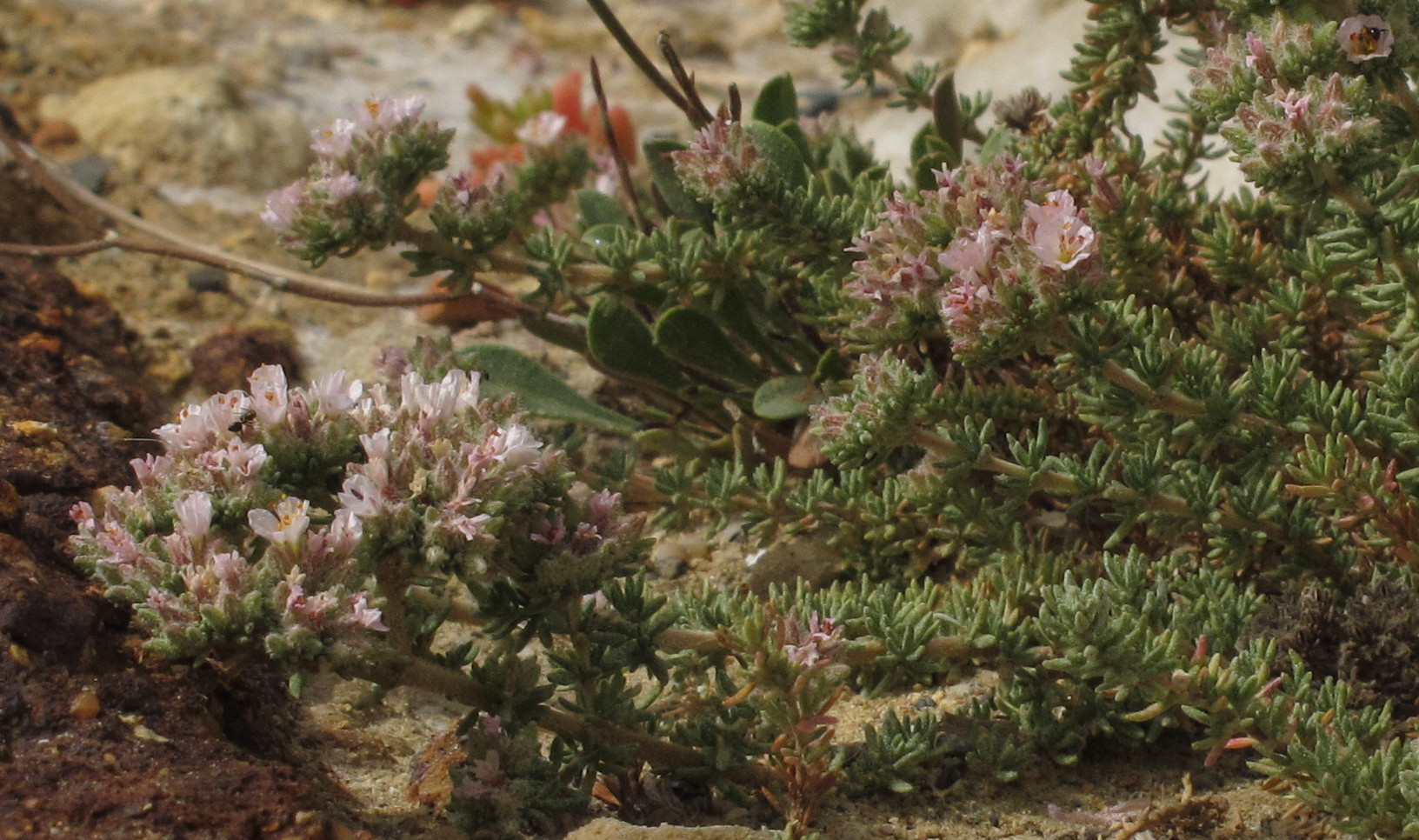

Scientific classification
- Kingdom: Plantae
- Clade: Tracheophytes
- Clade: Angiosperms
- Clade: Eudicots
- Order: Caryophyllales
- Family: Frankeniaceae
- Genus: Frankenia
- Species: F. hirsuta

Binomial name
- Frankenia hirsuta L.

Synonyms
- Frankenia laevis var. hirsuta

= Frankenia hirsuta =

Species of plant

Frankenia hirsuta is a species of plant in the family Frankeniaceae. They have a self-supporting growth form, individuals can grow to 17 cm tall.

== Sources ==
This article incorporates text from a free content work. Licensed under CC0 (license statement/permission). Text taken from Frankenia hirsuta. Encyclopedia of Life.
