= Areyongalepis =

Areyongalepis Temporal range: Ordovician

Scientific classification
- Kingdom: Animalia
- Phylum: Chordata
- Infraphylum: Agnatha
- Genus: †Areyongalepis; Young, 2000
- Species: †A. oervigi

Binomial name
- †Areyongalepis oervigi (Young, 1997)

Synonyms
- Genus: Areyonga Young, 1997; Species: Areyonga oervigi Young, 1997

Extinct genus of Pteraspidomorph fish

Areyongalepis is an extinct genus of jawless fish that lived in central Australia during the Ordovician period.

The genus was originally named Areyonga by Australian palaeontologist Gavin C. Young, but the name had already been allocated to a modern genus of wasp. Young therefore renamed the fossil fish Areyongalepis in 2000.
