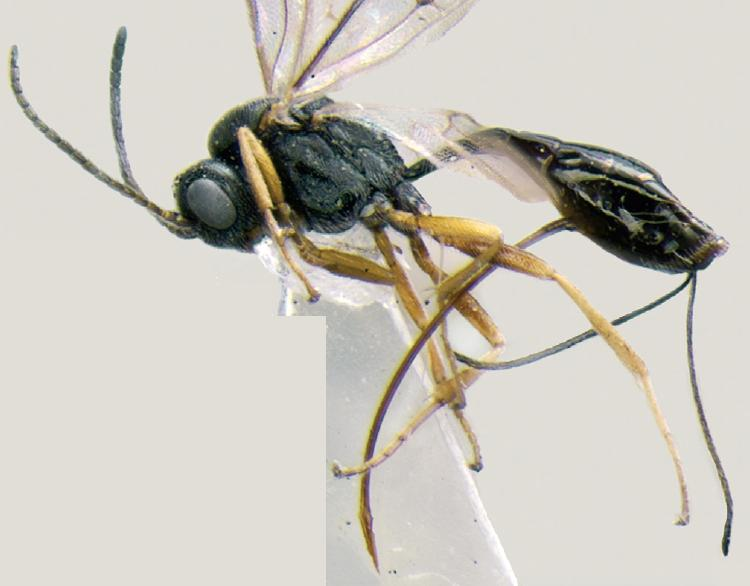
- Tersilochus runatus

Scientific classification
- Kingdom: Animalia
- Phylum: Arthropoda
- Clade: Pancrustacea
- Class: Insecta
- Order: Hymenoptera
- Family: Ichneumonidae
- Subfamily: Tersilochinae
- Genus: Tersilochus; Holmgren, 1859

Type species
- Porizon iocator (= Tersilochus jocator Holmgren, 1859) Gravenhorst, 1829

= Tersilochus =

Genus of wasps

Tersilochus is a genus of the parasitic wasp family Ichneumonidae. The type species is Tersilochus jocator.

== Species ==
- Subgenus Gonolochus Förster, 1869
  - Tersilochus caudatus Holmgren, 1860
  - Tersilochus fenestralis Thomson, 1889
  - Tersilochus nitens Horstmann & Kolarov, 1988
  - Tersilochus rugulosus Horstmann, 1981
  - Tersilochus stenocari Gregor, 1941
  - Tersilochus thuringiacus Schmiedeknecht, 1911
- Subgenus Pectinolochus Aubert, 1960
  - Tersilochus acutangulus Khalaim, 2007
  - Tersilochus apicator Khalaim, 2007
  - Tersilochus asper Horstmann, 1981
  - Tersilochus bulyuki Khalaim, 2007
  - Tersilochus coeliodicola Silvestri, 1917
  - Tersilochus ensifer Brischke, 1880
  - Tersilochus griseolus Khalaim, 2007
  - Tersilochus hungaricus Horstmann, 1981
  - Tersilochus intermedius Horstmann, 1981
  - Tersilochus junius Khalaim, 2007
  - Tersilochus kerzhneri Khalaim, 2007
  - Tersilochus lapponicus Hellén, 1958
  - Tersilochus luteicornis Hellén, 1958
  - Tersilochus rossicus Horstmann, 1981
  - Tersilochus rubrigaster Khalaim, 2007
  - Tersilochus spiracularis Horstmann, 1971
  - Tersilochus striola Thomson, 1889
  - Tersilochus terebrator Horstmann, 1971
  - Tersilochus ungularis Horstmann, 1981
- Subgenus Tersilochus Holmgren, 1859
  - Tersilochus abyssinicus Khalaim, 2006
  - Tersilochus brevissimus Horstmann, 1981
  - Tersilochus conotracheli Riley, 1871
  - Tersilochus curvator Horstmann, 1981
  - Tersilochus deficiens Provancher, 1888
  - Tersilochus dentatus Horstmann & Kolarov, 1988
  - Tersilochus filicornis Thomson, 1889
  - Tersilochus fulvipes Gravenhorst, 1829
  - Tersilochus heterocerus Thomson, 1889
  - Tersilochus jocator Holmgren, 1859
  - Tersilochus liopleuris Thomson, 1889
  - Tersilochus longicaudatus Horstmann, 1971
  - Tersilochus longicornis Thomson, 1889
  - Tersilochus meridionalis Morley, 1913
  - Tersilochus microgaster Szépligeti, 1899
  - Tersilochus ningxiator Khalaim & Sheng, 2009
  - Tersilochus nitidipleuris Horstmann, 1971
  - Tersilochus obliquus Thomson, 1889
  - Tersilochus obscurator Aubert, 1959
  - Tersilochus orientalis Uchida, 1942
  - Tersilochus petiolaris Horstmann, 1981
  - Tersilochus ruberi Horstmann, 1981
  - Tersilochus rufovarius Horstmann, 1981
  - Tersilochus runatus Khalaim & Sheng, 2009
  - Tersilochus rusticulus Khalaim, 2006
  - Tersilochus similis Szépligeti, 1899
  - Tersilochus subdepressus Thomson, 1889
  - Tersilochus thyridialis Horstmann, 1971
  - Tersilochus triangularis Gravenhorst, 1807
  - Tersilochus tripartitus Brischke, 1880
  - Tersilochus varius Horstmann, 1981
- Species incertae sedis:
  - Tersilochus consimilis Holmgren, 1860
  - Tersilochus dilatatus Brischke, 1880
  - Tersilochus longulus Brischke, 1880
  - Tersilochus quercetorum Strobl, 1901
  - Tersilochus sericeus Brischke, 1880
  - Tersilochus sulcatus Hellén, 1958

== Gallery ==
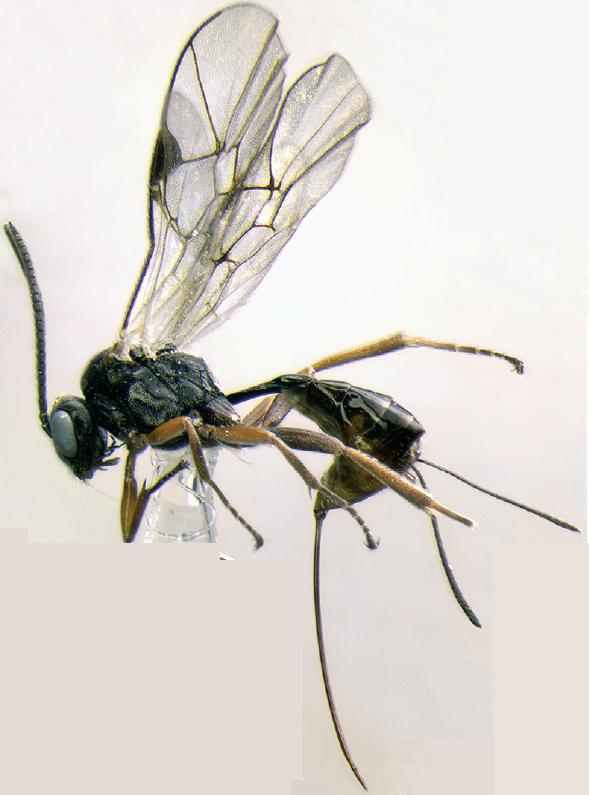
Tersilochus ningxiator Khalaim & Sheng, 2009

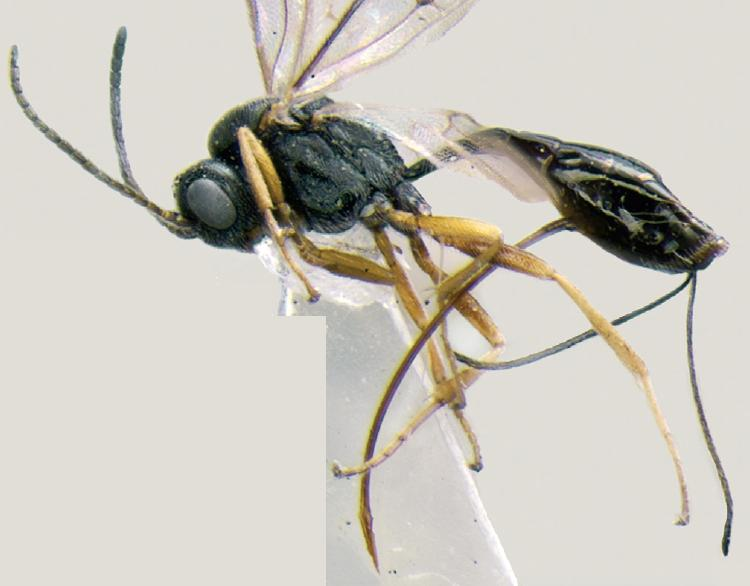
Tersilochus runatus Khalaim & Sheng, 2009
