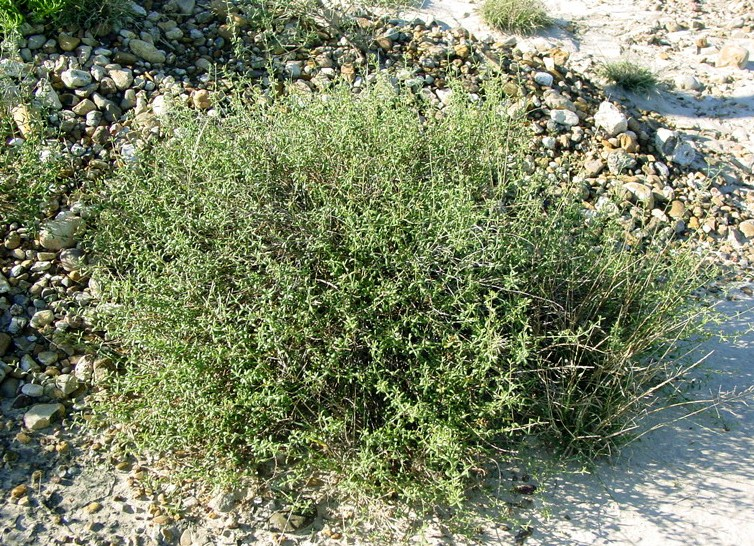

Conservation status
- Vulnerable (NatureServe)

Scientific classification
- Kingdom: Plantae
- Clade: Tracheophytes
- Clade: Angiosperms
- Clade: Eudicots
- Order: Caryophyllales
- Family: Frankeniaceae
- Genus: Frankenia
- Species: F. johnstonii

Binomial name
- Frankenia johnstonii Correll

= Frankenia johnstonii =

Species of flowering plant

Frankenia johnstonii is a species of flowering plant known by the common name Johnston's seaheath, or Johnston's frankenia. It is native to southern Texas in the United States and northern Nuevo León in Mexico, where there are about 30 occurrences known. The plant was federally listed as an endangered species in the United States in 1984. It was found to be more abundant than previously thought and it was proposed for delisting in 2003.

In 1984 there were only 6 populations known, all on privately owned land, and the plants appeared to be in poor condition and were reproducing slowly. Most plants observed had been trimmed down by grazing cattle, which also appeared to alter the habitat itself. Fewer than 2000 plants were counted and it was placed on the endangered species list of the United States. By 2003 many more populations had been discovered and it was suggested the plant be removed from the endangered species list. As of 2011 it was still listed.

This is a shrub which grows in open landscapes on soils rich in salts and gypsum. It grows alongside other halophiles such as saladillo (Varilla texana). It is gray-green to blue-green in color for most of the year except fall, when it turns bright red. The wiry stems may just exceed half a meter tall and the shrub takes on a rounded appearance. The small grayish or bluish leaf blades are coated in white hairs. The plant may bloom anytime between September and May, especially after rain falls. The flower is white with a yellow center. The plant makes very few seeds.

While the plant is no longer considered endangered there are still threats to its survival, such as petroleum exploration and the clearing of brush.
