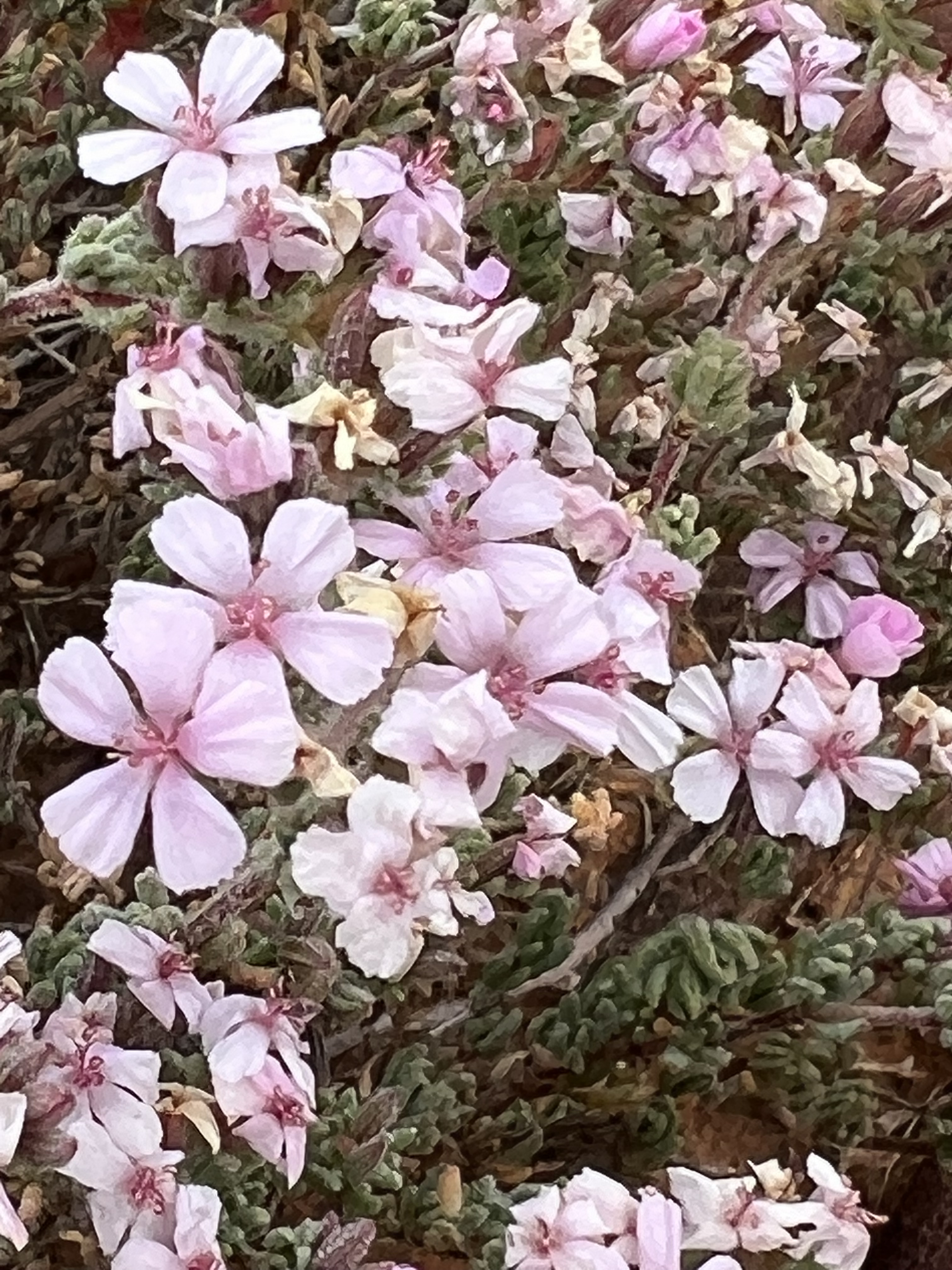

Scientific classification
- Kingdom: Plantae
- Clade: Tracheophytes
- Clade: Angiosperms
- Clade: Eudicots
- Order: Caryophyllales
- Family: Frankeniaceae
- Genus: Frankenia
- Species: F. cordata

Binomial name
- Frankenia cordata J.M.Black

= Frankenia cordata =

Species of plant

Frankenia cordata is a flowering plant in the family Frankeniaceae and grows in Western Australia, South Australia and the Northern Territory. It is a small, spreading shrub with pink flowers.

== Description ==
Frankenia cordata is a small, thickly branched shrub 15–25 cm (5.9–9.8 in) high, branches smooth to covered with soft, fine hairs or short soft, weak thin hairs that are spreading to slightly curved. The leaves are yellow-green to greyish, usually heart-shaped at the base, 2–8 mm (0.079–0.315 in) long, dotted with small hollows, leaves variable, narrow to broadly egg-shaped, oblong or triangular, thickened in the middle at the base, flattened toward leaf margin, 0.5–1.1 mm (0.020–0.043 in) wide at the apex and 0.1–0.8 mm (0.0039–0.0315 in) long. The lower surface sometimes smooth with occasional to thickly covered with soft, upright, spreading to slightly curved hairs, upper surface mostly smooth with occasional soft, upright hairs. The flowers are borne at the top 1-4 nodes of higher branches mostly in dichasia formation of 2-17 flowers or singly, 5-6 pink spoon-shaped petals, 9–16.5 mm (0.35–0.65 in) long and the bracts fused at the base in whorls of 4. Flowering occurs from February to October and the fruit has 1-3 seeds.

== Taxonomy and naming ==
Frankenia cordata was first formally described in 1918 by John McConnell Black and the description was published in Transactions and proceedings of the Royal Society of South Australia. The specific epithet (cordata) means "heart-shaped" referring to the leaves.

== Distribution and habitat ==
This species is often found growing in saline soils, flood plains, clay-sand and rocky locations in South Australia, Western Australia and the Northern Territory.
