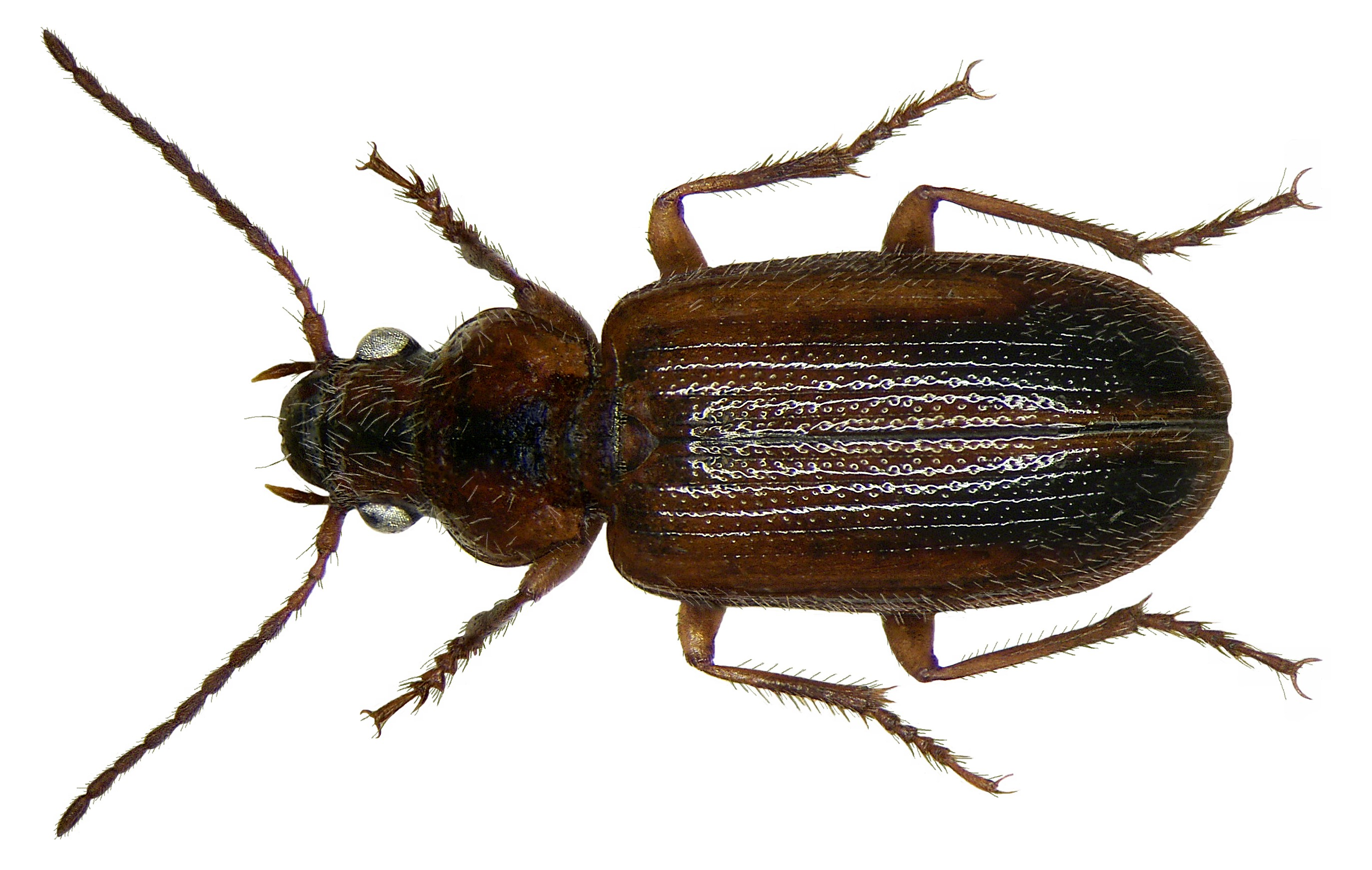

Scientific classification
- Domain: Eukaryota
- Kingdom: Animalia
- Phylum: Arthropoda
- Class: Insecta
- Order: Coleoptera
- Suborder: Adephaga
- Family: Carabidae
- Subfamily: Harpalinae
- Tribe: Harpalini
- Genus: Dicheirotrichus
- Species: D. gustavii

Binomial name
- Dicheirotrichus gustavii Crotch, 1871

= Dicheirotrichus gustavii =

Species of beetle

Dicheirotrichus gustavii is a ground beetle which emerges from cracks or holes to feed on tidal salt marshes after dusk. Despite living in a coastal environment, it has no cycle of behaviour linked to the tides, simply scurrying for dry land when caught by the approaching sea. It will eat the larvae of another intertidal beetle, Bledius spectabilis, if they are left unprotected by the adult.
