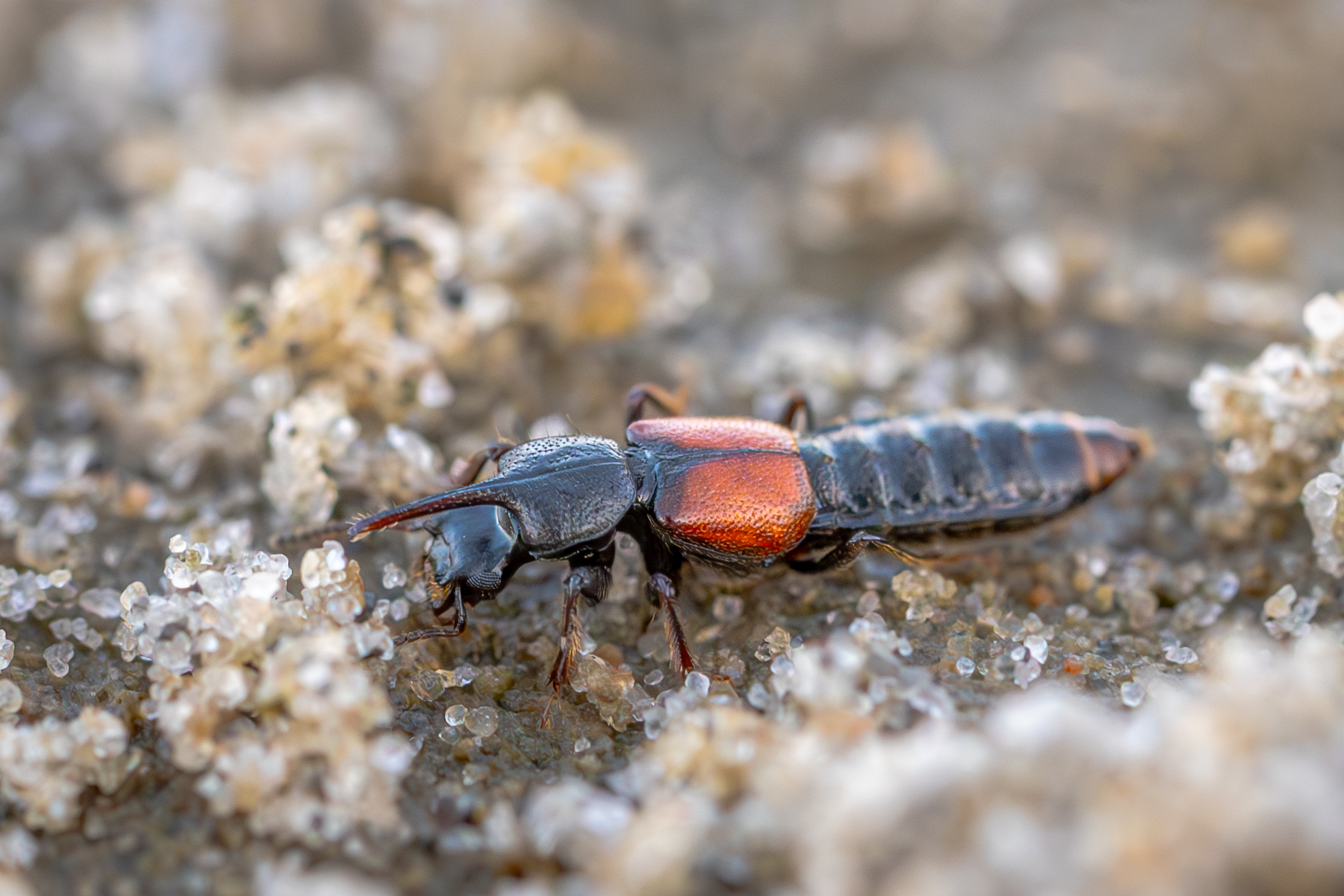
- Bledius spectabilis, male

Scientific classification
- Kingdom: Animalia
- Phylum: Arthropoda
- Clade: Pancrustacea
- Class: Insecta
- Order: Coleoptera
- Suborder: Polyphaga
- Infraorder: Staphyliniformia
- Family: Staphylinidae
- Genus: Bledius
- Species: B. spectabilis

Binomial name
- Bledius spectabilis Kraatz, 1857

= Bledius spectabilis =

Species of beetle

Bledius spectabilis, commonly known as the magnificent salt beetle, is a species of small rove beetle.

== Description ==
This beetle is 5 to 7 millimetres long and has brightly coloured legs. The wing covers are brownish and as wide as they are long.

== Distribution ==
Bledius spectabilis inhabits the sea shores of the Caspian and Black Seas, the coasts of the Mediterranean from Asia Minor to Spain and Morocco, and the Atlantic coast as far north as the Irish Sea and the North Sea.

== Behaviour ==
Bledius spectabilis, shows very unusual behaviour for an insect in that it actively protects its larvae from the parasitic wasp Barycnemis blediator and from the predatory Dicheirotrichus gustavii.
