= Phradis =

Scientific classification
- Domain: Eukaryota
- Kingdom: Animalia
- Phylum: Arthropoda
- Class: Insecta
- Order: Hymenoptera
- Family: Ichneumonidae
- Genus: Phradis; Förster, 1869

Genus of wasps

Phradis is a genus of parasitoid wasps belonging to the family Ichneumonidae.

The species of this genus are found in Europe and Southern Africa.

Species:

- Phradis arivienae Khalaim, 2007
- Phradis brachyarthrus Khalaim, 2007
