= Heterocola =

Scientific classification
- Domain: Eukaryota
- Kingdom: Animalia
- Phylum: Arthropoda
- Class: Insecta
- Order: Hymenoptera
- Family: Ichneumonidae
- Genus: Heterocola; Förster, 1869

Genus of wasps

Heterocola is a genus of parasitoid wasps belonging to the family Ichneumonidae.

The species of this genus are found in Europe.

Species:

- Heterocola concava (Uchida, 1956)
- Heterocola linguaria (Haliday, 1838)
