= Ctenophion =

Ctenophion niger

Scientific classification
- Kingdom: Animalia
- Phylum: Arthropoda
- Clade: Pancrustacea
- Class: Insecta
- Order: Hymenoptera
- Family: Ichneumonidae
- Genus: Ctenophion; Horstmann, 2010
- Species: C. niger

Binomial name
- Ctenophion niger Horstmann, 2010

Genus of wasps

Ctenophion is a genus of the parasitic wasp family Ichneumonidae. It currently consists of only one species, Ctenophion niger, from the Nearctic.

The genus is larger than the usual Ichneumonidae wasp, with its body length ranging from 4 to 5.5 millimeters.
