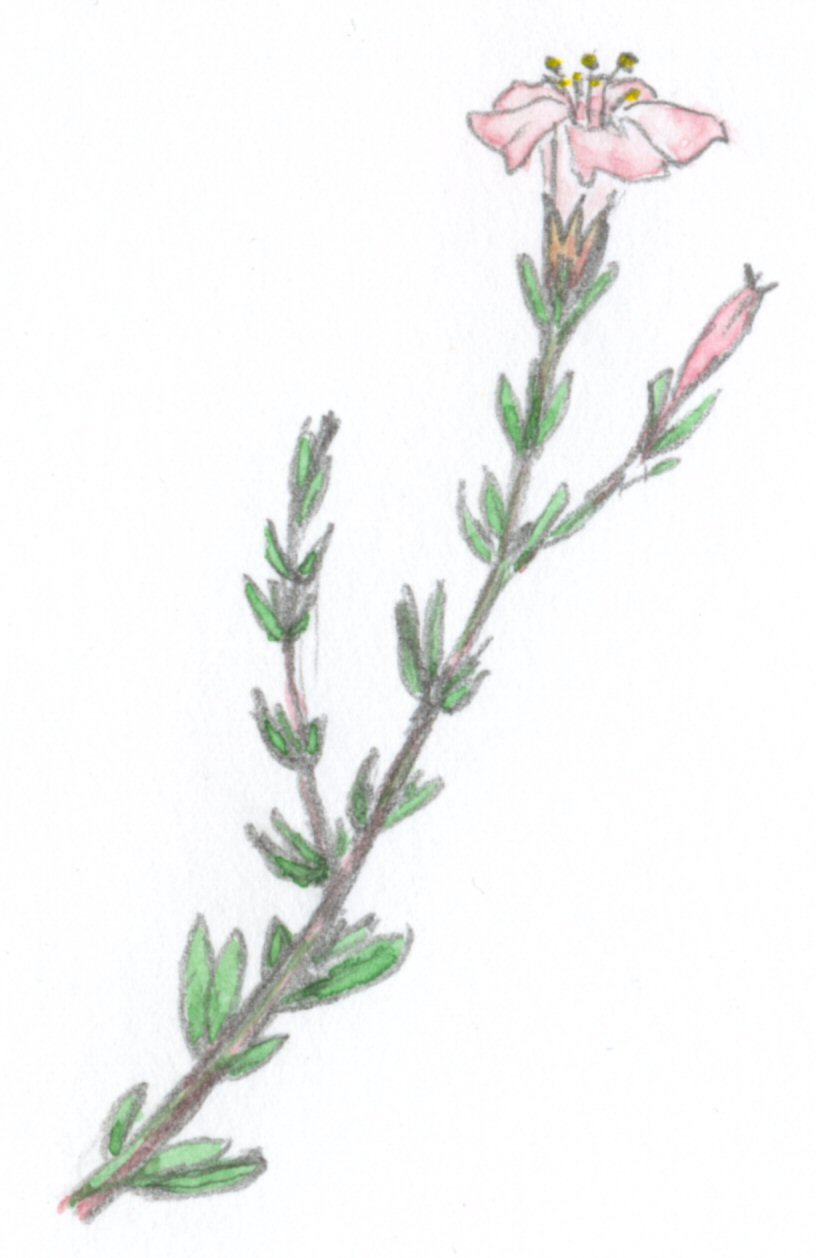

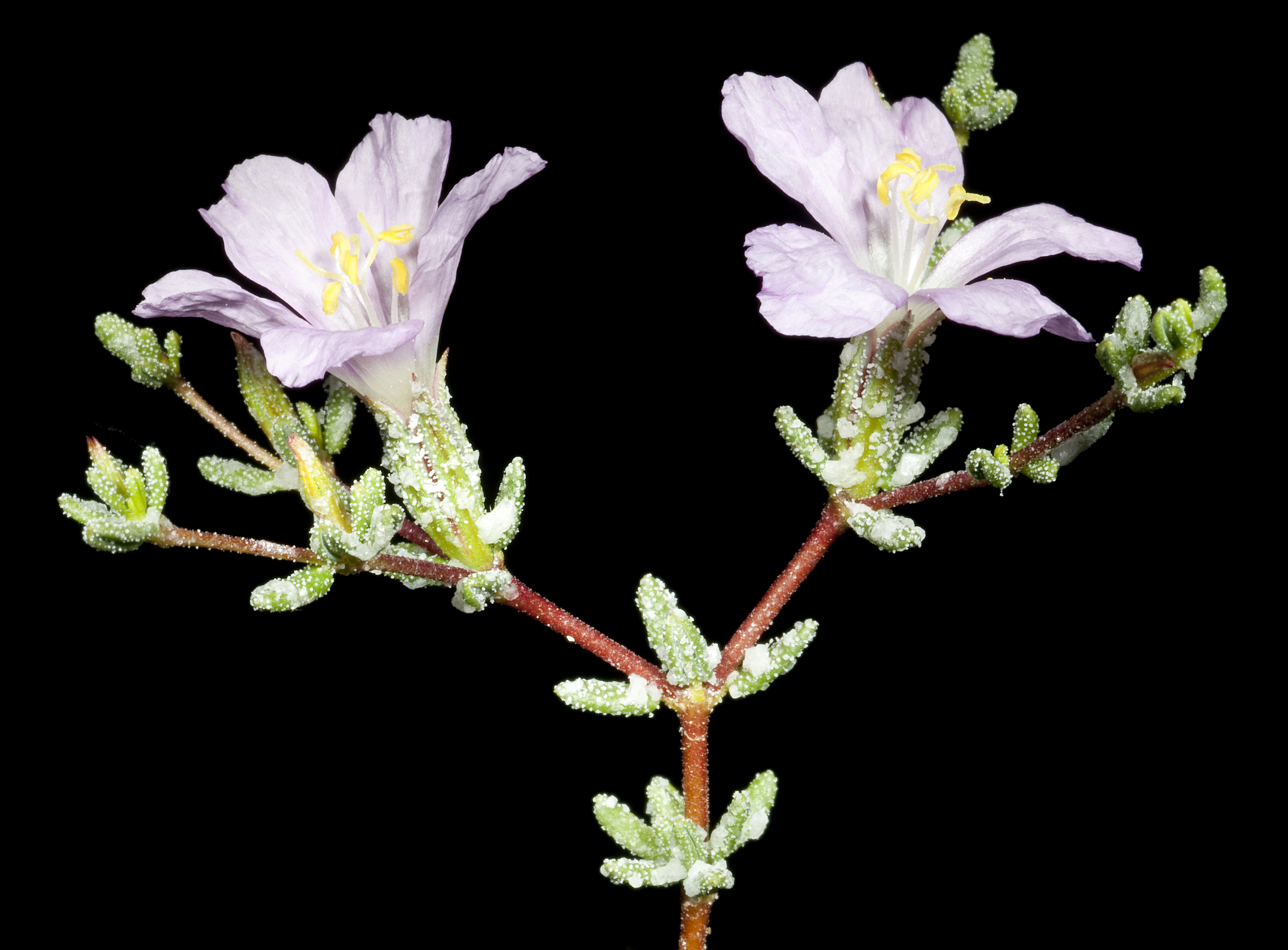

Scientific classification
- Kingdom: Plantae
- Clade: Tracheophytes
- Clade: Angiosperms
- Clade: Eudicots
- Order: Caryophyllales
- Family: Frankeniaceae
- Genus: Frankenia
- Species: F. pauciflora

Binomial name
- Frankenia pauciflora DC.

= Frankenia pauciflora =

Common sea-heath

Species of plant

Frankenia pauciflora, the common sea-heath or southern sea-heath, is an evergreen shrub native to southern Australia. It is part of the Frankenia genus of the Frankeniaceae family.

It can be prostrate or may grow up to 0.5 m in height. Pink or white flowers are produced between June and February in its native range. It occurs in saline flats, salt marshes, or coastal limestone areas.

== Taxonomy ==
The specific epithet pauciflora, referring the Latin words paucus, meaning few, and florus meaning flower, referring to the fact that the species produces few flowers.

== Varieties ==
The currently recognised varieties are:

- F. p. var. fruticulosa (DC.) Summerh.
- F. p. var. gunnii Summerh.
- F. p. var. longifolia Summerh.
- F. p. var. pauciflora DC.

== Habitat ==
Frankenia pauciflora is characterized as a halophyte and as such is found to localize in sandy soils, salt floats, salt marshes, and coastal limestones. The plant subsists in environments with a soil class of S2 and S3 which is described as moderately to highly saline soil. The species is a xerophyte, a drought-tolerant plant and survives in environments with sustained predictable dry periods followed by periods of moist soil. Frankenia pauciflora can subsist in a range of soil pHs ranging from acidic to alkaline. In addition, the plant tolerates hot overhead sun to warm low sun and is characterized as is shade tolerant.

=== Distribution ===
The species occurs in Western Australia, South Australia, Victoria, and Tasmania, where it is represented by the variety F. p. var. gunnii which only grows on Flinders, Short, and Harcus Islands. The species is generally considered not threatened, but F. p. var gunnii is considered rare as it only has a small population located in Tasmania that may be at more risk. Var. fruticulosa is found primarily in Southern Australia; var. longifolia is found in Western and Southern Australia, and var. pauciflora is found in only Western Australia.

== Description ==
Individuals of this species are prostrate perennial shrubs up to 0.5 m in height. It forms many branches that create a thick mat-like structure. It produces fleshy, linear grey-green leaves reaching up to 2 cm, somewhat resembling thyme. The leaves can range for hairless to densely haired.

=== Flowers ===
Its flowers are 2 cm across, stalkless and are generally pink, but sometimes white. The flowers have four to six petals that usually have irregular edges. The flowers bloom either solitary at the base of stalks or in bunches of 2–25 that can be found either at the base or end of stems. Each flower is supported by 4 bracts. The circular pollen has a tricolpate morphology with a reticulated surface pattern. The species in the Frankenia pauciflora is distinguished from other members of its family by the structure of its ovaries. The female flower has a 3-branched style, while the male flower most commonly has six stamens. The ovaries usually have 3 placentae in a basal or parietal configuration. Each placenta is known to contain 2-6 ovules. The fruit is a small brown cylindrical capsule shape.

=== Leaves ===
Due to its halophytic properties, Frankenia pauciflora’s leaves are covered in minuscule salt crystals. These crystals cover the smooth upper surface of the leaf, which range from 2 to 13 mm long and 0.5 to 2.2 mm wide. Small hairs can be seen on most leaves, mainly on the midrib of the lower surface, along with folded over edges. Its leaves generally wilt and turn brown during drought periods. Var gunnii is distinguished in that they have longer, narrower leaves, and inconspicuous mid vein.

=== Seeds ===
There is one brown seed per fruit capsule, a cylindrical capsule with 5 or 6 ribbed parts measuring 3–7 mm long. The seeds come attached with a pappus-like structure and separate easily from the fruits. Seeds are sprouted during the months of late January to mid-March.

=== Bark ===
Frankenia pauciflora's bark differs from its trunk versus its younger branches. Its new branches have a smoother, and rusty brown appearance while its trunk contains rough and flaky grey to brown bark.

== Reproduction ==
Frankenia pauciflora does not have a set flowering time, flowering throughout the year but particularly between the months of June and February, and can produce seeds at any time during the year. The flowers of Frankenia pauciflora are insect-pollinated to produce dicotyledon seeds. In particular, the flower of F. p. var gunnii are pollinated by insects in the order Diptera, Hymenoptera and Lepidoptera. It has been found that xenogamy in this species leads to more fruits per flower and more seeds in each fruit compared to autogamy; this was reported to be true in both observational studies and controlled experiments.

== Uses ==
The relative simplicity of growth and ability for the plant to adapt to a wide range of soils makes Frankenia Pauciflora an attractive choice for home gardening. Its flame-retardant properties also provide reduced chances of bush-fire spread in risk zones such as Australia when planted surrounding homes.

Frankenia pauciflora provides shelter for many faunae as well as being a food source for a number of insects. Its thick network of fine roots are also useful for providing stability in sediments and floodplains.
