= Probles =

Scientific classification
- Kingdom: Animalia
- Phylum: Arthropoda
- Class: Insecta
- Order: Hymenoptera
- Family: Ichneumonidae
- Subfamily: Tersilochinae
- Genus: Probles; Förster, 1868

Genus of wasps

Probles is a genus of ichneumonid wasp of the subfamily Tersilochinae. It has a widespread distribution.

Species in Probles have been grouped into subgenera. Horstmann 1971, which named the subgenera P (Rhynchoprobles) and P (Euporizon), assigned the following species

- P. (Euporizon) including P. thomsoni, exilis, gilvipes, montanus, pygmaeus, xanthopus, marginatus, nigriventris, corsicator, rufipes, clavicornis, and truncorum,
- P. (Rhynchoprobles) including P. lonisetosus
- P. (Probles), including P. erythrostomus, flavipes, and brevivalvis

== Species ==
- Probles alejandroi, (Khalaim & Ruiz-Cancino, 2019)
- Probles anatolicus, (Horstmann, 1981)
- Probles antennalis, (Horstmann, 1981)
- Probles belokobylskii, (Khalaim & Ruiz-Cancino, 2019)
- Probles brevicauda, (Horstmann, 1981)
- Probles brevicornis, (Horstmann, 1981)
- Probles brevivalvis, (Horstmann, 1971)
- Probles brevivalvus, (Horstmann, 1971)
- Probles canariensis, (Horstmann, 1980)
- Probles carpathicus, (Khalaim, 2007)
- Probles caudiculatus, (Khalaim, 2007)
- Probles clavicornis, (Horstmann, 1971)
- Probles clypeola, (Khalaim & Ruiz-Cancino, 2019)
- Probles contrerasi, (Khalaim & Ruiz-Cancino, 2019)
- Probles curvicauda, (Horstmann, 1981)
- Probles erythrostromus, (Gravenhorst, 1829)
- Probles exilis, (Holmgren, 1860)
- Probles extensor, (Aubert, 1971)
- Probles flavipes, (Szepligeti, 1899)
- Probles fulgida, (Khalaim & Balueva, 2013)
- Probles juaniate, (Khalaim & Ruiz-Cancino, 2019)
- Probles kasparyator, (Khalaim, 2007)
- Probles korusa, (Khalaim & Kim, 2013)
- Probles kotenkoi, (Khalaim, 2003)
- Probles kunashiricus, (Khalaim, 2003)
- Probles longicaudator, (Aubert, 1972)
- Probles longisetosus, (Hedwig, 1956)
- Probles lucidus, (Szepligeti, 1899)
- Probles lunai, (Khalaim & Ruiz-Cancino, 2019)
- Probles maturus, (Provancher, 1886)
- Probles megasoma, (Khalaim & Ruiz-Cancino, 2019)
- Probles miquihana, (Khalaim & Ruiz-Cancino, 2019)
- Probles montanus, (Horstmann, 1971)
- Probles neoversutus, (Horstmann, 1967)
- Probles nigriventris, (Horstmann, 1971)
- Probles picus, (Khalaim & Ruiz-Cancino, 2019)
- Probles pygmaeus, (Zetterstedt, 1838)
- Probles rarus, (Horstmann, 1981)
- Probles ruficornis, (Szepligeti, 1899)
- Probles rufipes, (Holmgren, 1860)
- Probles rukora, (Khalaim & Lee, 2013)
- Probles sibiricus, (Khalaim, 2007)
- Probles spectabilis, (Khalaim & Ruiz-Cancino, 2019)
- Probles temporalis, (Horstmann & Kolarov, 1988)
- Probles temulentus, (Khalaim, 2007)
- Probles tenuicornis, (Horstmann, 1981)
- Probles thomsoni, (Schmiedeknecht, 1911)
- Probles truncorum, (Holmgren, 1860)
- Probles versutus, (Holmgren, 1860)
- Probles vulnificus, (Khalaim & Sheng, 2009)
- Probles xalapana, (Khalaim & Ruiz-Cancino, 2019)
- Probles zacapoaxtlana, (Khalaim & Ruiz-Cancino, 2019)
