= Bledius philadelphicus =

Scientific classification
- Domain: Eukaryota
- Kingdom: Animalia
- Phylum: Arthropoda
- Class: Insecta
- Order: Coleoptera
- Suborder: Polyphaga
- Infraorder: Staphyliniformia
- Family: Staphylinidae
- Genus: Bledius
- Species: B. philadelphicus

Binomial name
- Bledius philadelphicus Fall, 1919

Synonyms
- Bledius dickersoni Notman, 1922; Bledius mixtus Notman, 1922

Species of beetle

Bledius philadelphicus is a species of spiny-legged rove beetle in the family Staphylinidae. It is found in North America.
