= Barycnemis blediator =

Scientific classification
- Domain: Eukaryota
- Kingdom: Animalia
- Phylum: Arthropoda
- Class: Insecta
- Order: Hymenoptera
- Family: Ichneumonidae
- Genus: Barycnemis
- Species: B. blediator

Binomial name
- Barycnemis blediator (Aubert, 1970)

Species of wasp

Barycnemis blediator is a small parasitic wasp. It lays its eggs in the larvae of the salt marsh rove beetle, Bledius spectabilis, which shows unusual behaviour for an insect in that it actively protects its young from the wasp.
