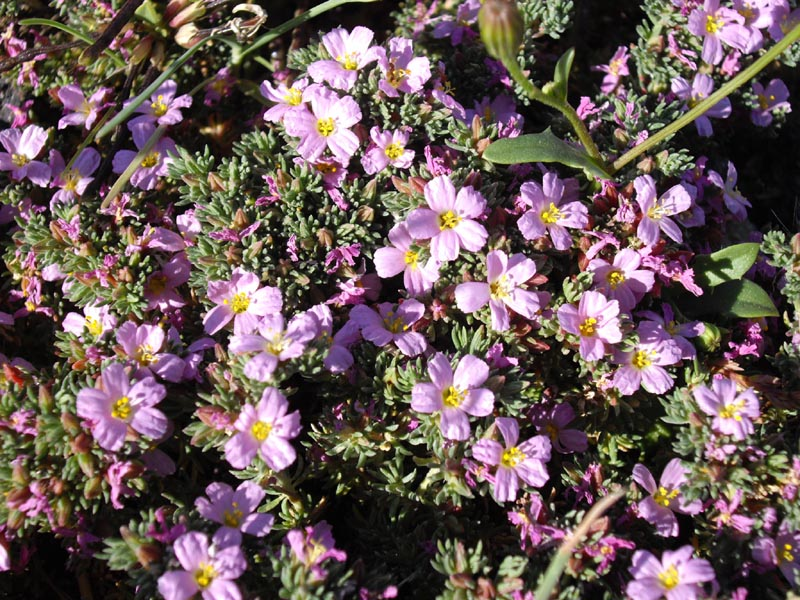

Scientific classification
- Kingdom: Plantae
- Clade: Tracheophytes
- Clade: Angiosperms
- Clade: Eudicots
- Order: Caryophyllales
- Family: Frankeniaceae
- Genus: Frankenia
- Species: F. laevis

Binomial name
- Frankenia laevis L.

= Frankenia laevis =

Sea heath

Species of flowering plant

Frankenia laevis, commonly sea heath, is a low shrub in the family Frankeniaceae. It is native to south-west Europe and Britain and to northwestern Africa, including Macaronesia. It grows on the coast. It is rare in Britain.

== Distribution ==
Frankenia laevis is native to the south-west of Europe (the Balearic Islands, Corsica, France, Italy, Portugal, Sardinia, and Spain), Sicily, Great Britain, the Azores, and the west of north Africa (Algeria, Morocco and Tunisia).
