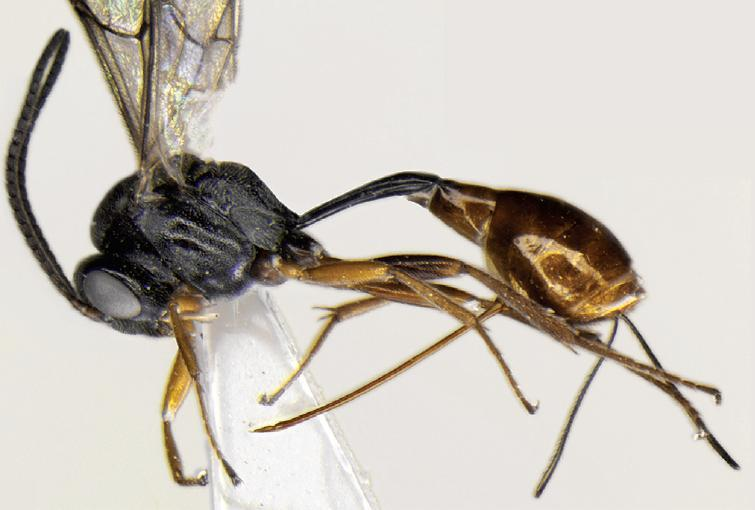
- Diaparsis nitidulentis (female)

Scientific classification
- Domain: Eukaryota
- Kingdom: Animalia
- Phylum: Arthropoda
- Class: Insecta
- Order: Hymenoptera
- Family: Ichneumonidae
- Genus: Diaparsis; Förster, 1869

= Diaparsis =

Genus of wasps

Diaparsis is a genus of parasitoid wasps belonging to the family Ichneumonidae.

The genus has cosmopolitan distribution.

Species:

- Diaparsis abstata Khalaim, 2013
- Diaparsis americana (Brues, 1916)
- Diaparsis aneucliformis Khalaim, 2013
- Diaparsis frontella (Holmgren, 1860) - parasitoid of Scolytus rugulosus
- Diaparsis gerlingi
- Diaparsis lompobattanga Khalaim 2022
- Diaparsis niphadoctona He, 1995
