= Areyonga (wasp) =

Scientific classification
- Kingdom: Animalia
- Phylum: Arthropoda
- Clade: Pancrustacea
- Class: Insecta
- Order: Hymenoptera
- Superfamily: Ichneumonoidea
- Family: Ichneumonidae
- Genus: Areyonga; Gauld, 1984
- Species: A. eremica

Binomial name
- Areyonga eremica Gauld, 1984

Genus of wasps

Areyonga is a genus of the parasitic wasp family Ichneumonidae. It currently consists of only one species, Areyonga eremica, from Australia.

The genus has a few distinguishing features: it lacks occipital carina, the lower mandibular tooth is reduced to a vestigial state, and the segments at the base of the flagellum of each antenna are short 'annellar-like'. The describing author Gauld inferred that it was related to the genus Probles.
