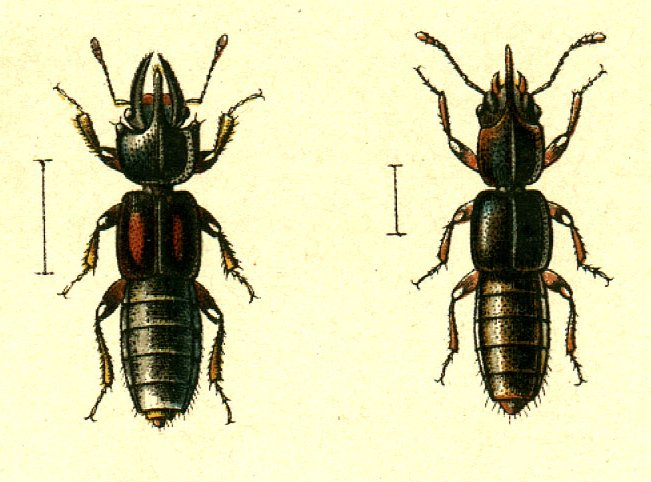
- Bledius furcatus (left) and Bledius unicornis (right)

Scientific classification
- Domain: Eukaryota
- Kingdom: Animalia
- Phylum: Arthropoda
- Class: Insecta
- Order: Coleoptera
- Suborder: Polyphaga
- Infraorder: Staphyliniformia
- Family: Staphylinidae
- Subfamily: Oxytelinae
- Tribe: Blediini
- Genus: Bledius; Leach, 1819

= Bledius =

Genus of beetles

Bledius is a genus of spiny-legged rove beetles in the family Staphylinidae. There are at least 100 described species in Bledius.

== See also ==
- List of Bledius species
