= Algodones Dunes =

Sand dune field in southeastern California

- Erg
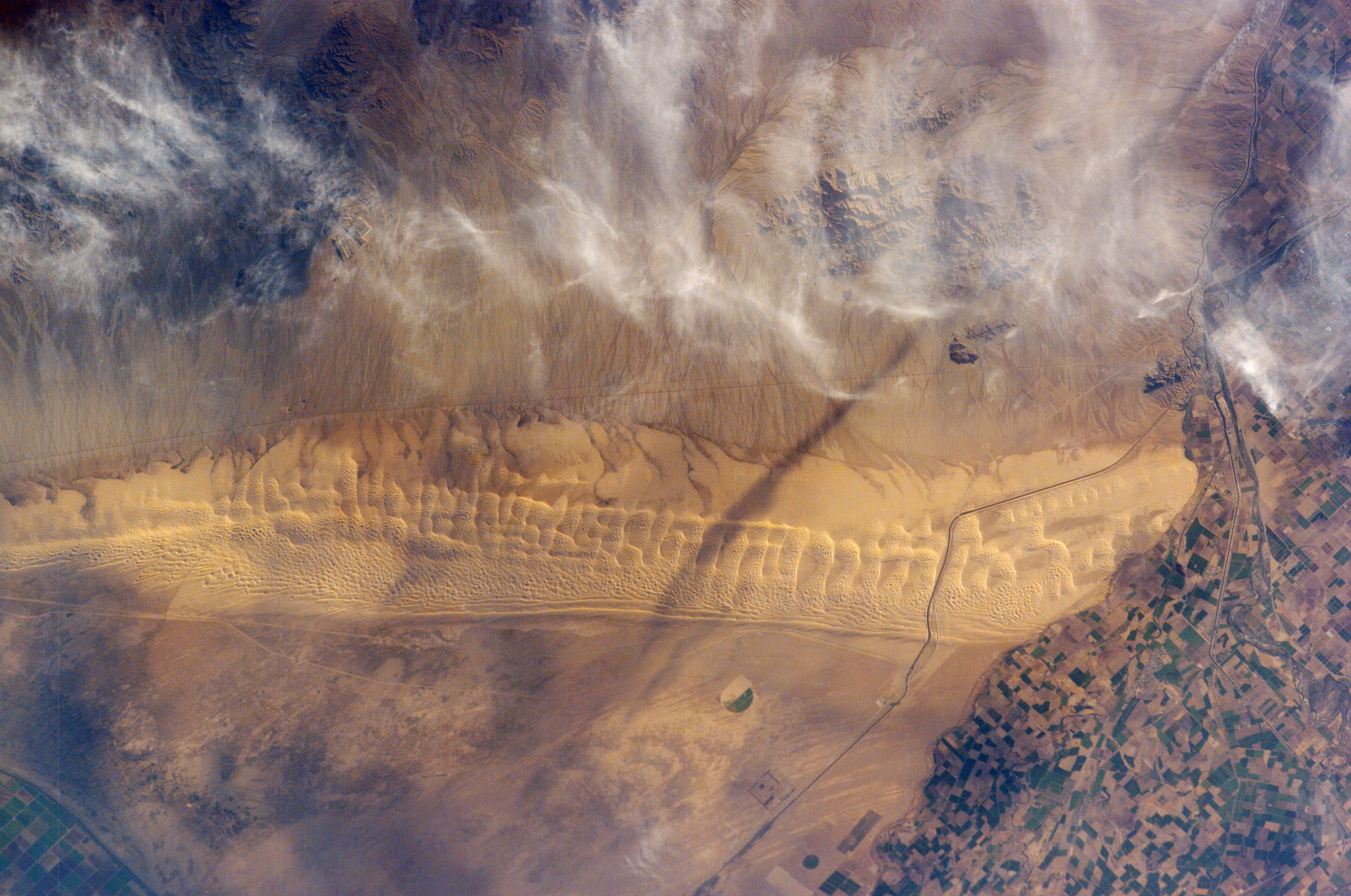
- The dunes from space
- Interactive map of Algodones Dunes
- Coordinates: 32°55′N 115°3′W
- Location: Sonoran Desert, Imperial County, California, United States

Dimensions
  - Length: 45 miles (72 km)
  - Width: 6 miles (9.7 km)

The Algodones Dunes is a large sand dune field, or erg, located in the southeastern portion of the U.S. state of California, near the border with Arizona and the Mexican state of Baja California. The field is approximately 45 miles (72 km) long by 6 miles (9.7 km) wide and extends along a northwest–southeast line that correlates to the prevailing northerly and westerly wind directions. The name "Algodones Dunes" refers to the entire geographic feature, while the administrative designation for that portion managed by the Bureau of Land Management is the Imperial Sand Dunes Recreation Area (sometimes called the Glamis Dunes). In 1966, Imperial Sand Hills was designated as a National Natural Landmark by the National Park Service. The Algodones Dunes are split into many different sections. These sections include Glamis, Gordon's Well, Buttercup, Midway, and Patton's Valley. Although the Arabic-derived Spanish word algodones translates to "cotton plants", the origin of the toponym is unknown.

== Location ==
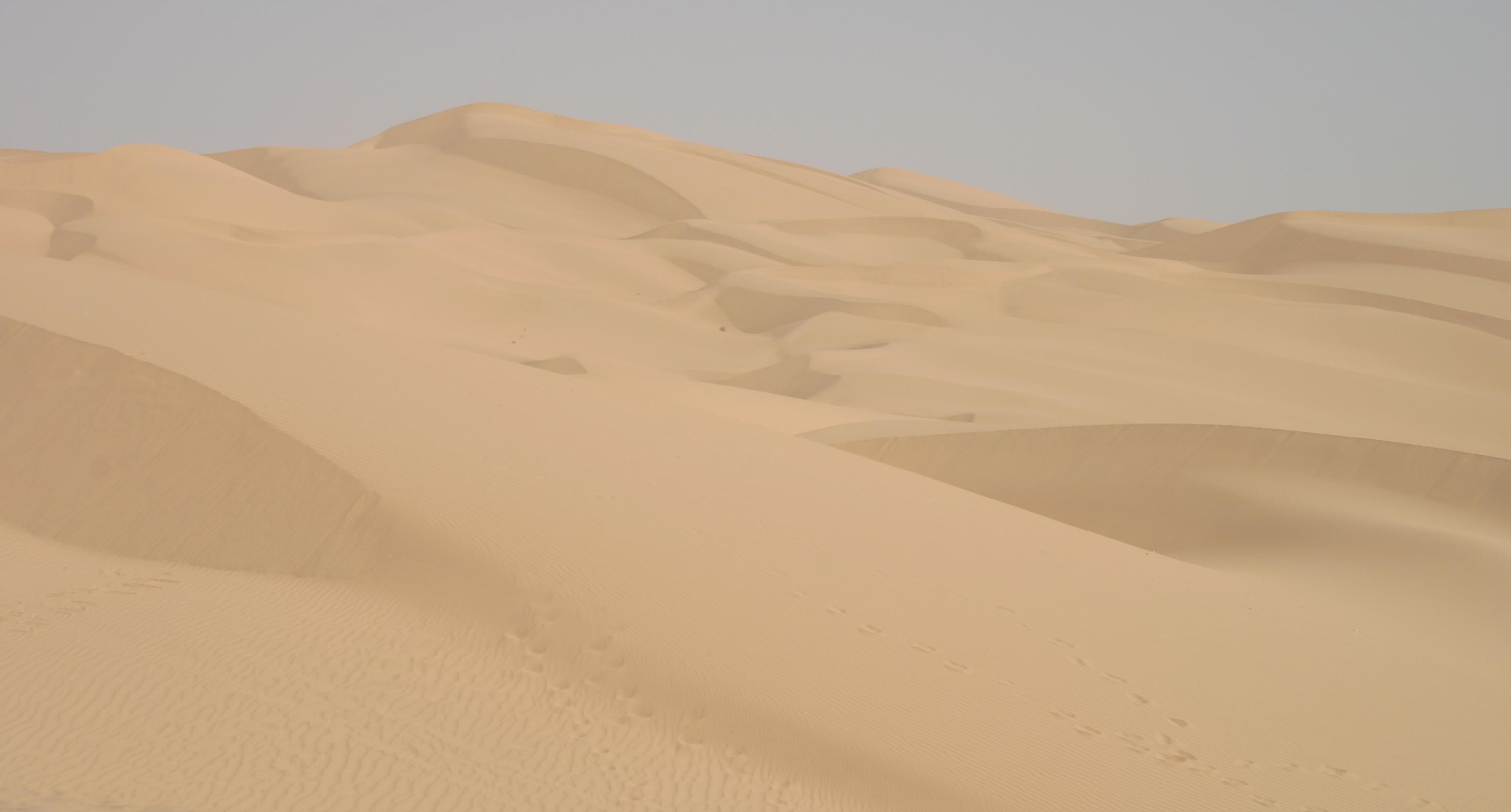
Imperial Sand Dunes recreation area

The dunes are located west of the Chocolate Mountains in Imperial County, and are crossed by Interstate 8 and State Route 78, which passes through the old train stop of Glamis at the eastern edge of the dune field. The northwestern end is located at 33°8′53″N 115°19′29″W about 11 miles (18 km) east of Calipatria, California, and the southeastern end is located at 32°41′4″N 114°46′7″W near Los Algodones in Mexico, about 6 miles (9.7 km) west of Yuma, Arizona. The dunes are also now separated at the southern end by agricultural land from the much more extensive Gran Desierto de Altar, to which they once were linked as an extreme peripheral "finger". The only significant human-made structures in the area are the All-American Canal that cuts across the southern portion from east to west and the Coachella Canal on the western edge.

== History ==
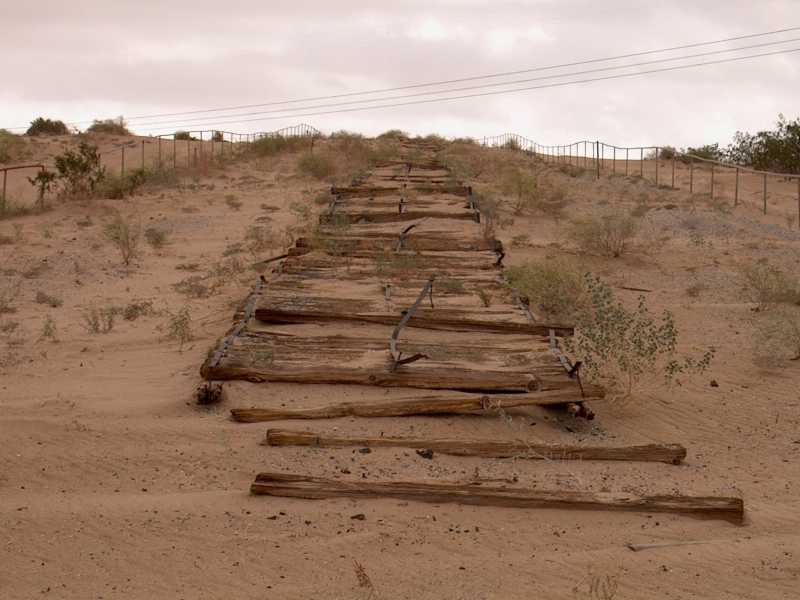
Remains of Old Plank Road in 2001

Because the Colorado River flowed through very flat terrain, the course of the river varied over a wide area, being periodically diverted in one direction or another by silt deposits remaining after floods. Sometimes the river flowed into the Gulf of California, as it did until irrigation in the Imperial Valley and Mexicali Valley dried it up before reaching there; other times it turned westward toward the Salton Sink. Each time the Salton Sink received the river flow, a large freshwater lake called Lake Cahuilla formed. The last Lake Cahuilla covered much of the Imperial, Coachella and Mexicali Valleys as late as 1450. The most popular theory holds that the Algodones Dunes were formed from windblown beach sands of Lake Cahuilla. The prevailing westerly and northwesterly winds carried the sand eastward from the old lake shore to their present location which continues to migrate southeast by approximately one foot per year.

The dunes have frequently been a barrier to human movement in the area. Foot travelers frequently diverted south into Mexico, and in 1877 the Southern Pacific Railroad was diverted north to avoid the dunes, but in 1915 Colonel Ed Fletcher built a wooden plank road across the dunes to prove that cars could cross the dunes and to connect San Diego with Yuma, Arizona. This trail eventually became part of Interstate 8. During World War II, the U.S. military conducted desert warfare training on the dunes, which were part of the California-Arizona Maneuver Area. People have been driving on the dunes for recreation almost since vehicles first reached the area, which may have been the proving ground for the first dune buggy, a modified Ford Model A. Off-road driving surged following World War II when surplus Jeeps became available to the public.

== Current recreational use ==
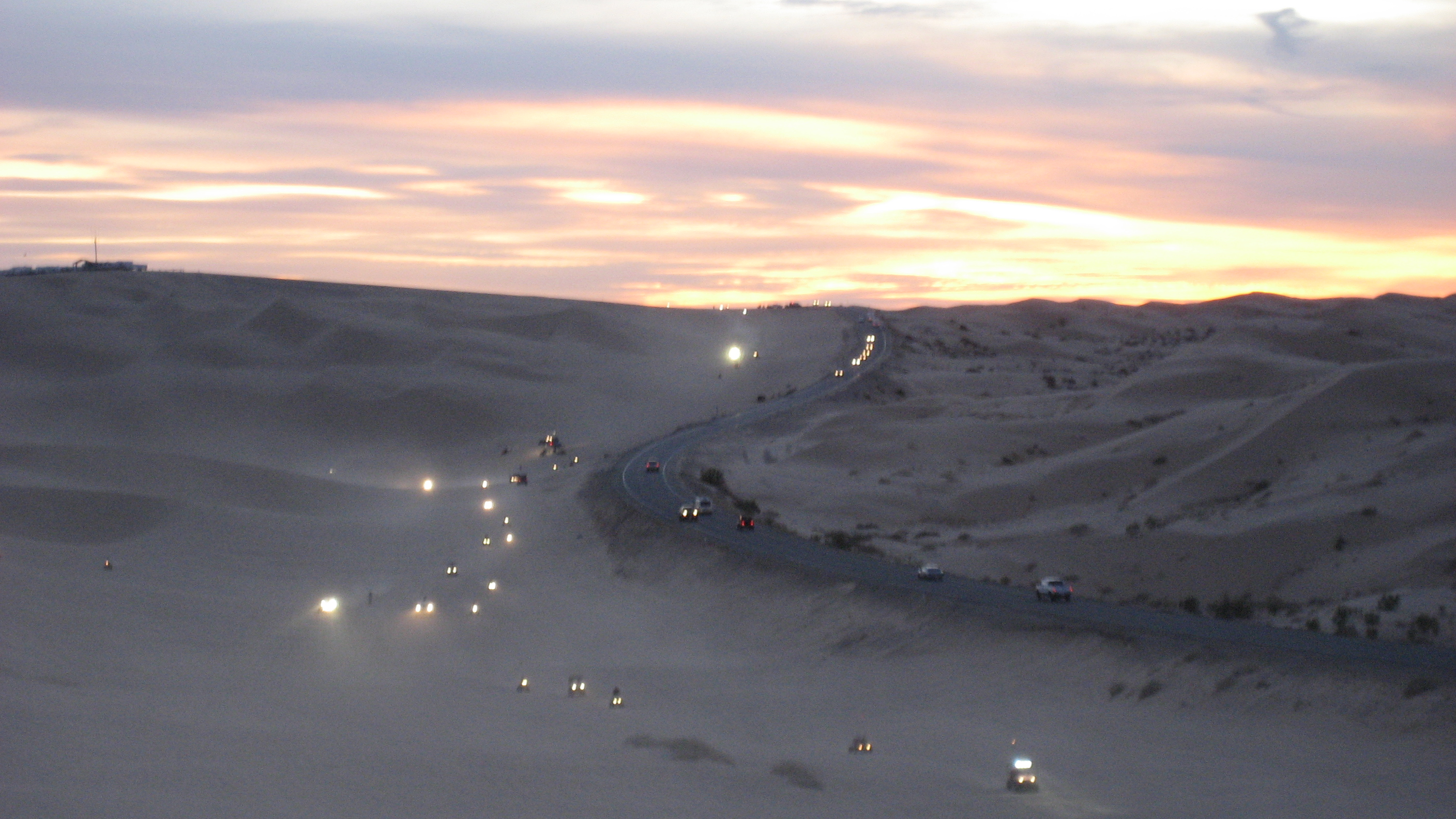
Holiday traffic on Presidents Day weekend

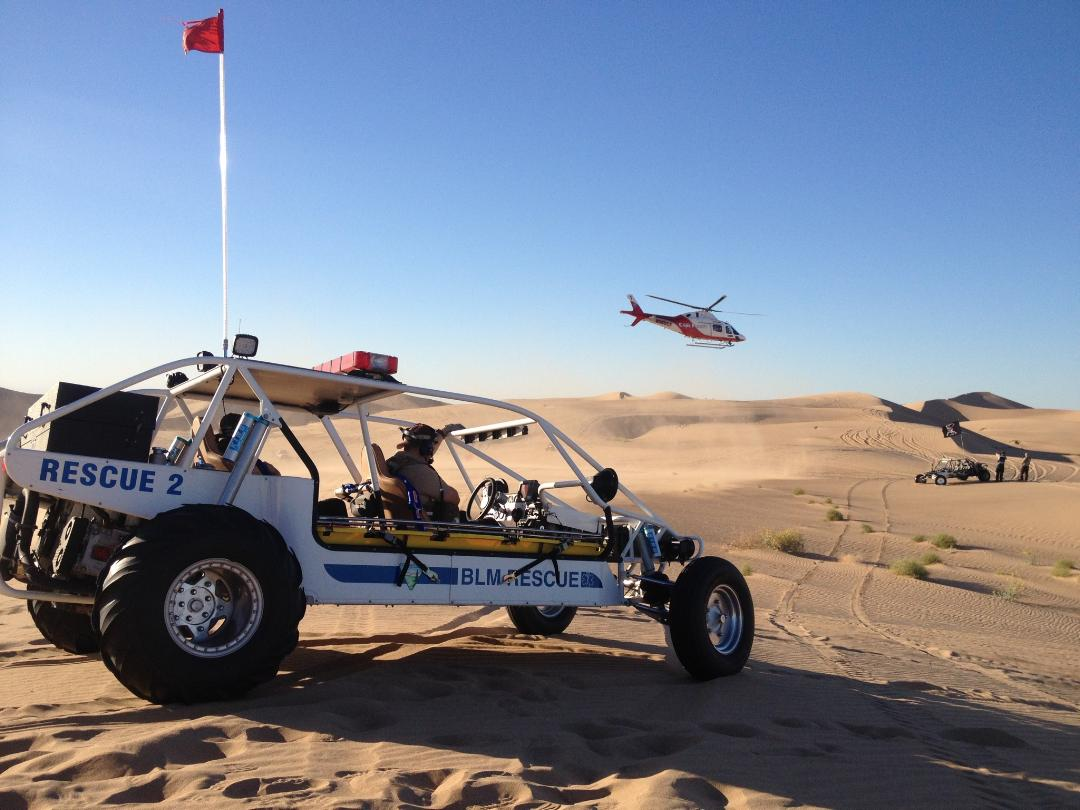
BLM Ranger EMS rescue vehicles and helicopter drill, Algodones Dunes ORV area

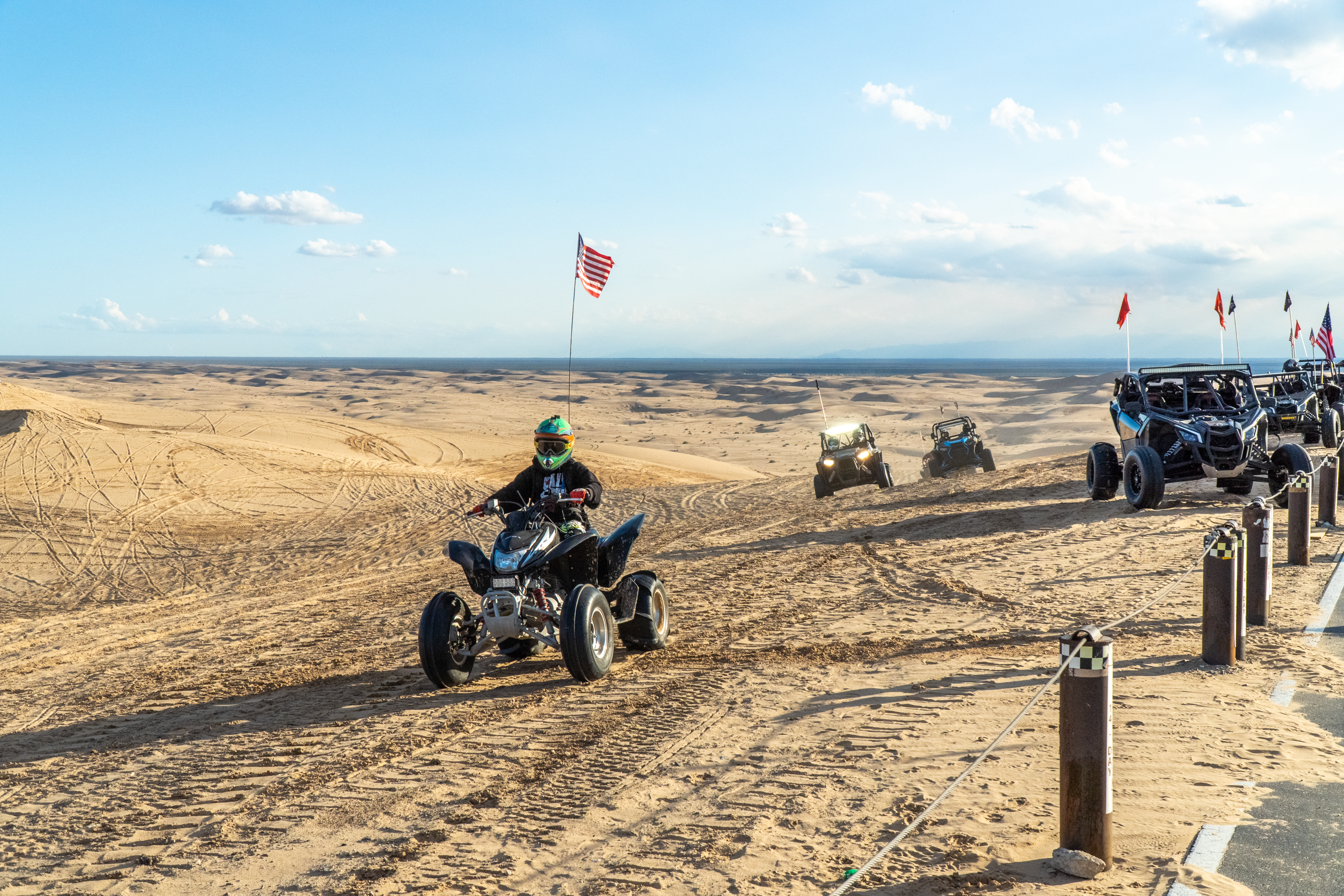
ATVs at Algodones Dunes

Environmental protection groups (notably the Center for Biological Diversity) and off-highway vehicle advocacy groups (notably the American Sand Association) have filed numerous petitions and lawsuits to either restrict or re-open vehicular access to the dunes. Most of the dunes located north of State Route 78 are off-limits to vehicular traffic due to designation as the North Algodones Dunes Wilderness. The federal government protected these 25,818 acres (10,448 ha) in the early 1980s and closed them to vehicles as part of the 1994 California Desert Protection Act (Public Law 103-433). Much of the area south of this road remains open for off-highway vehicle use, though a lawsuit in 2000 closed over 49,000 acres (20,000 ha) to vehicular access, leaving about 40% of the recreation area open to vehicles. In 2014, a significant portion (approximately 40,000 acres) of this area was re-opened for vehicular use. It is the largest sand dunes open to off-highway vehicle use in the United States. The site's large sand dunes are a preferred terrain for many off-road vehicle owners. Motorcycles, sandrails, ATVs, and 4-wheel-drive vehicles are commonly driven across the dunes. Open camping is permitted, and on major winter holidays, as many as 150,000 people can visit in a single weekend. These recreationalists bring an economic boom during the cooler months to the nearby towns of Brawley, California, Yuma, Arizona and El Centro, California.

== Ecology ==
According to the A. W. Kuchler U.S. Potential natural vegetation Types, the Algodones Dunes would have a Desert (vegetation absent) (46) vegetation type and a Great Basin Shrubland (7) vegetation form. Research indicates that there is significant reduction in the diversity and abundance of species in dune areas subject to heavy ORV traffic. A two-year survey of dune insects revealed over 1100 species were present, at least 60 of which were new to science.

Pholisma sonorae, commonly known as sand food, is a rare perennial parasitic plant that can be found in the Algodones Dunes and surrounding areas. This species only grows in sand dunes and is threatened by off-road vehicle use throughout much of its habitat.

== Endemic species ==
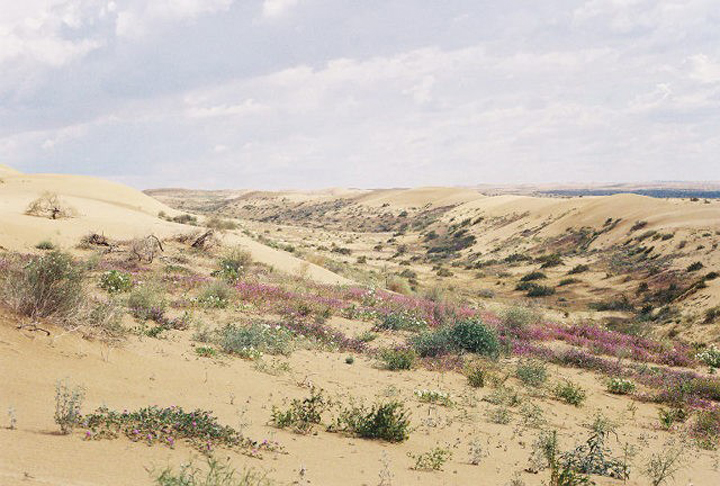
North Algodones Dunes Wilderness – vegetation not disturbed by recreational vehicles

As they are the largest dune ecosystem in the United States, there are many species which are endemic to the Algodones system, so the region overall is biologically unique on a global scale. The Algodones were once part of an even greater dune system that now resides primarily in the Mexican state of Sonora, with a few extensions also in southwestern Arizona, especially in the vicinity of Yuma. Accordingly, it is likely that many of the species presently known only from the Algodones also occur in the Gran Desierto de Altar in Mexico, but this is difficult to ascertain without biological surveys of the latter area.

- The perennial plant Peirson's milkvetch (Astragalus magdalenae var. peirsonii) is found in the Algodones and is listed as a threatened species under the U.S. Endangered Species Act and as an endangered species under the California Endangered Species Act. The plant germinates only during years of sufficient rainfall. In one such year, 2003, over 71,000 plants were estimated to be present in the open areas of the dunes, and it is suspected at least that many more in the closed areas.

Among insects, there are dozens of species found only in Algodones or its neighboring areas, including:

- Pseudocotalpa andrewsi — (a scarab beetle)
- Pseudocotalpa sonorica — (a scarab beetle)
- Anomala hardyorum — (a scarab beetle)
- Megasoma sleeperi — (a scarab beetle)
- Trigonoscuta rothi — (a weevil)
- Lepismadora algodones — the Algodones sand jewel beetle
- Agrilus harenus — (a buprestid beetle)
- Prasinalia imperialis — (a buprestid beetle)
- Ageniella arenicola — (a spider wasp)
- Ageniella pernia — (a spider wasp)
- Microbembex elegans — (a sand wasp)
- Stictiella villegasi — (a sand wasp)
- Plenoculus n. sp. — (a crabronid wasp)
- Perdita algodones — (an andrenid bee)
- Perdita frontalis — (an andrenid bee)
- Perdita glamis — (an andrenid bee)
- Efferia macroxipha — (a robber fly)

In August 2006, federal wildlife officials decided not to list these species under the Endangered Species Act, due primarily to insufficient documentation of their distribution and phenology; biological survey work is planned to address this.

== Movie setting ==
The dunes were used to film parts of Road to Morocco, The Flight of the Phoenix, The Garden of Allah (1936 film), Tobruk, Stargate, Resident Evil: Extinction, Jumanji: The Next Level and the Tatooine scenes in Return of the Jedi. John Ford made the 1934 version of The Lost Patrol (1934 film) here. Outside of movies, the dunes also appear in the opening sequence of the TV series Kung Fu, and were the filming location for the music video of Deftones' 2003 single Minerva.

== Climate ==
According to the Köppen climate classification system, the Algodones Dunes have a Hot desert climate (BWh). According to the United States Department of Agriculture, the Plant Hardiness zone is 10a with an average annual extreme minimum temperature of 32.7 °F (0.4 °C).

Climate data for 6 S Glamis, Imperial County, CA
Month	Jan	Feb	Mar	Apr	May	Jun	Jul	Aug	Sep	Oct	Nov	Dec	Year
Mean daily maximum °F (°C)	69.1 (20.6)	73.0 (22.8)	79.4 (26.3)	86.4 (30.2)	94.9 (34.9)	103.2 (39.6)	107.1 (41.7)	106.4 (41.3)	101.5 (38.6)	90.1 (32.3)	77.3 (25.2)	67.8 (19.9)	88.1 (31.2)
Mean daily minimum °F (°C)	43.3 (6.3)	47.2 (8.4)	51.8 (11.0)	57.5 (14.2)	65.4 (18.6)	72.9 (22.7)	79.3 (26.3)	80.9 (27.2)	74.6 (23.7)	62.3 (16.8)	51.0 (10.6)	42.5 (5.8)	60.8 (16.0)
Average precipitation inches (mm)	0.46 (12)	0.49 (12)	0.39 (9.9)	0.07 (1.8)	0.04 (1.0)	0.01 (0.25)	0.20 (5.1)	0.43 (11)	0.24 (6.1)	0.27 (6.9)	0.16 (4.1)	0.52 (13)	3.28 (83)
Average relative humidity (%)	39.5	37.2	33.0	26.7	24.3	21.6	29.0	33.3	31.1	31.3	34.3	39.2	31.7
Average dew point °F (°C)	31.9 (−0.1)	33.9 (1.1)	35.7 (2.1)	35.8 (2.1)	40.4 (4.7)	44.0 (6.7)	56.2 (13.4)	60.5 (15.8)	53.8 (12.1)	43.6 (6.4)	35.4 (1.9)	30.8 (−0.7)	41.9 (5.5)
Source: PRISM Climate Group
