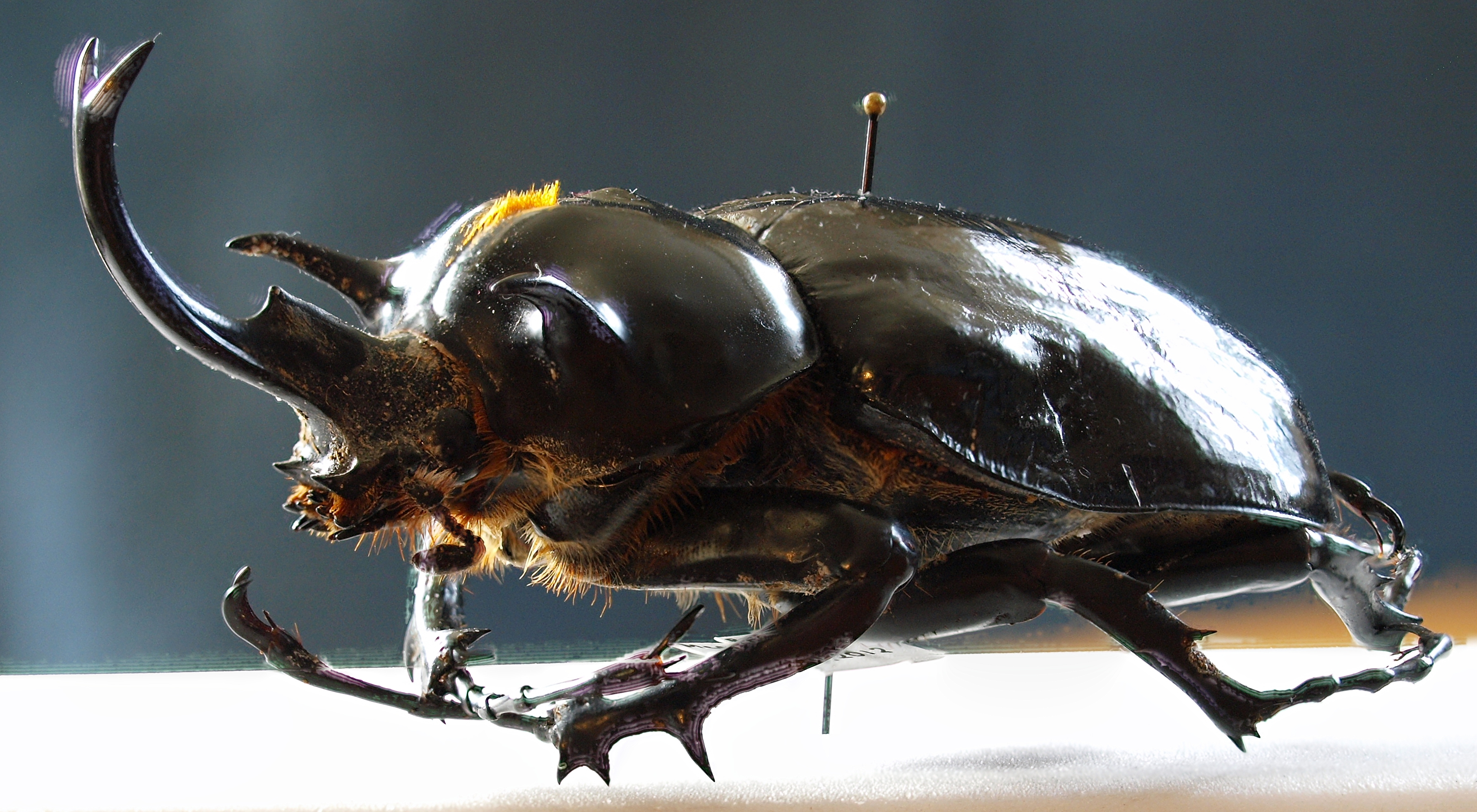

Scientific classification
- Kingdom: Animalia
- Phylum: Arthropoda
- Class: Insecta
- Order: Coleoptera
- Suborder: Polyphaga
- Infraorder: Scarabaeiformia
- Family: Scarabaeidae
- Genus: Megasoma
- Species: M. mars

Binomial name
- Megasoma mars Reiche, 1852

= Megasoma mars =

Species of beetle

Megasoma mars, also known as the mars beetle or mars rhino beetle, is the largest species in the Megasoma genus. It is distributed primarily in the west-central Amazon basin of Brazil, ranging down into Colombia, Paraguay, and Uraguay.

== Description ==
Megasoma mars is a large, horned beetle which typically ranges between 80 - 120 mm long, but has been observed to reach up to 140mm long. It is black and has smooth, shiny elytra. A lack of dorsal vestiture, or hairlike scales on its back, sets it apart from similar & related beetles such as M. actaeon. As with all Megasoma species, M. mars has strong legs with large claws in order to aid in holding onto tree branches.

== Diet ==
While there are no recorded observations of M. mars feeding in the wild, in captivity larvae will eat decayed wood and leaves in the families of oak, beech, and chestnut, and adults will eat fruit.

== Lifecycle ==
Megasoma mars can live approximately 24 months from egg to adult. Eggs will incubate for 1 month, and once they hatch they will spend a majority of their life in larval form, eating and growing. They will then pupate for some 3 months, and after emerging will take 2 additional months to mature to a full adult. Adult M. mars beetles have been observed living for about 8 months in captivity.
