= Megasoma punctulatum =

Scientific classification
- Domain: Eukaryota
- Kingdom: Animalia
- Phylum: Arthropoda
- Class: Insecta
- Order: Coleoptera
- Suborder: Polyphaga
- Infraorder: Scarabaeiformia
- Family: Scarabaeidae
- Genus: Megasoma
- Species: M. punctulatum

Binomial name
- Megasoma punctulatum Cartwright, 1952

Species of beetle

Megasoma punctulatum also known as the Arizona elephant beetle is a species of rhinoceros beetle in the family Scarabaeidae.
