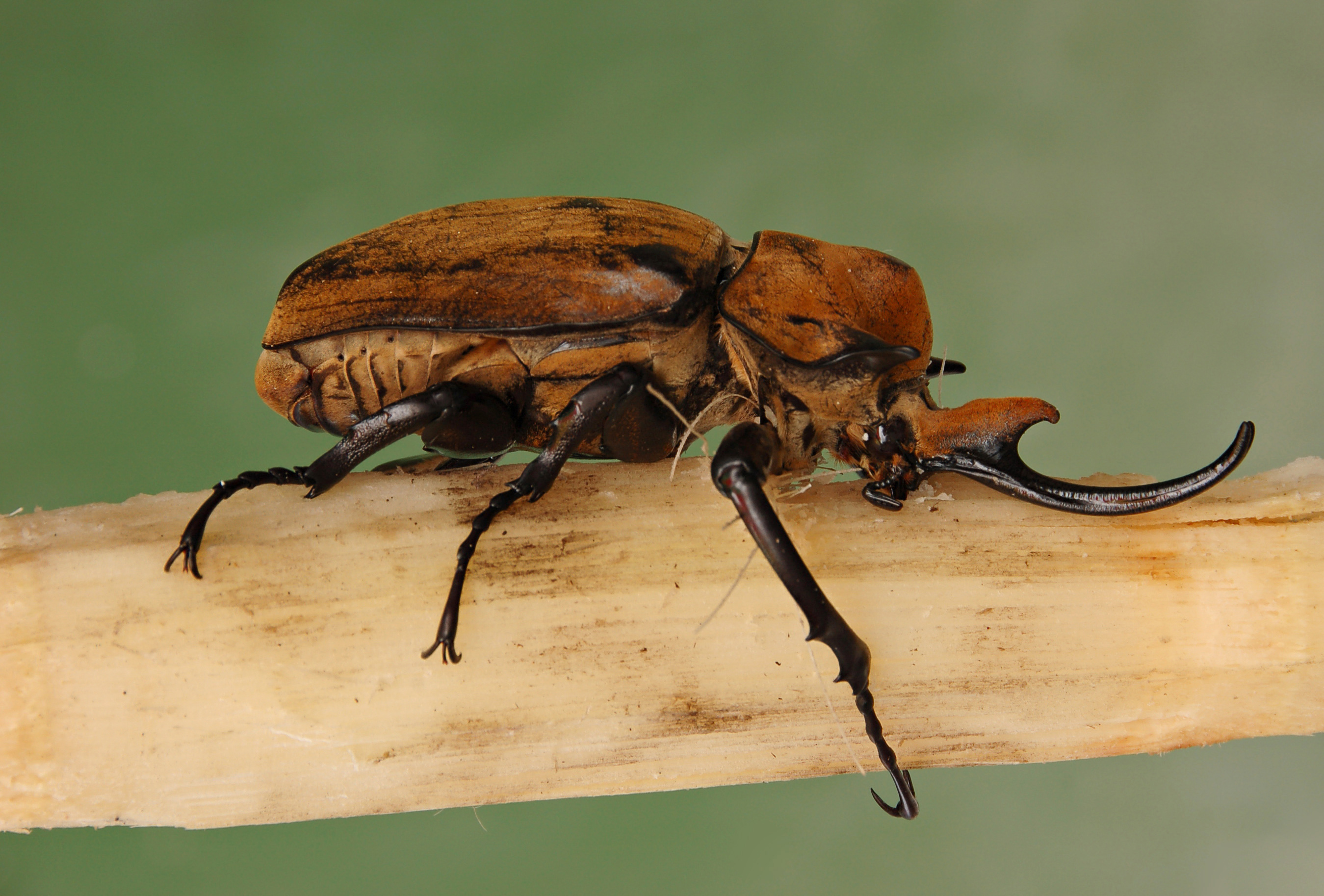

Scientific classification
- Kingdom: Animalia
- Phylum: Arthropoda
- Clade: Pancrustacea
- Class: Insecta
- Order: Coleoptera
- Suborder: Polyphaga
- Infraorder: Scarabaeiformia
- Family: Scarabaeidae
- Genus: Megasoma
- Species: M. elephas

Binomial name
- Megasoma elephas (Fabricius, 1775)

Subspecies
- M. e. elephas M. e. iijimai

Synonyms
- Scarabaeus elephas Fabricius, 1775; Megasoma mexicanum Fischer, 1968

= Elephant beetle =

Species of beetle

The elephant beetle (Megasoma elephas) is a member of the family Scarabaeidae and the subfamily Dynastinae. Elephant beetles are Neotropical rhinoceros beetles.

== Appearance ==
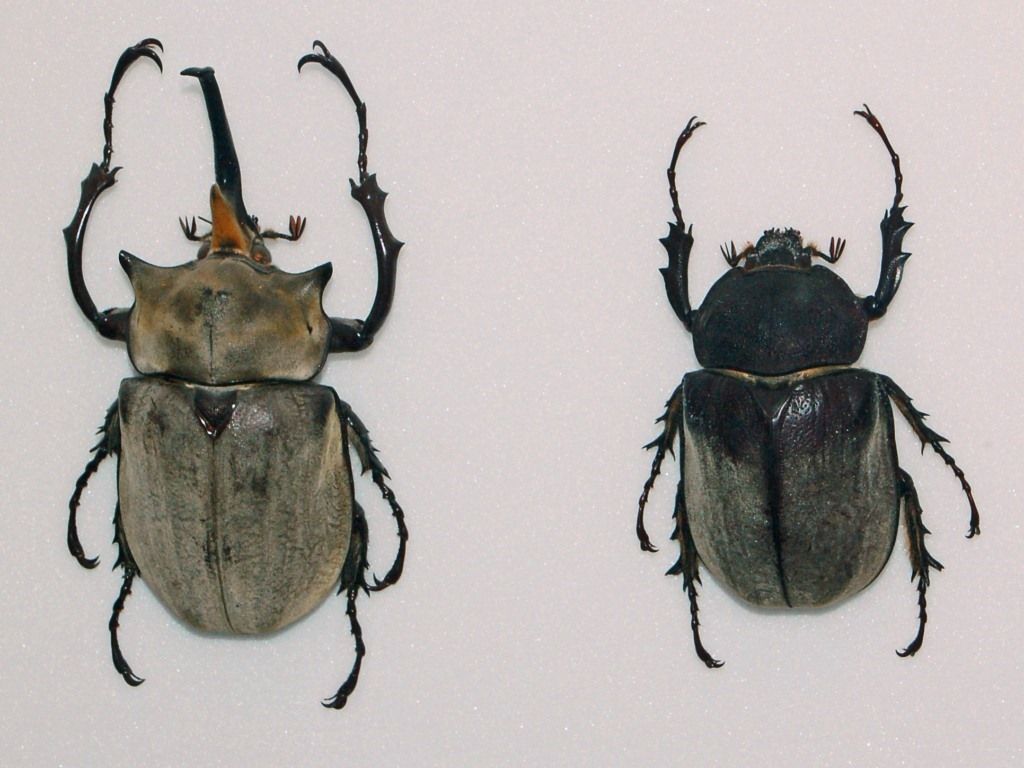
Male and female of Megasoma elephas at the Montreal Insectarium

Elephant beetles are black in color and covered with a coat of fine microscopic hairs. The hairs grow particularly thick on the beetle's elytra, and give its body a yellowish color. Males have two horns protruding from the head and another from the prothorax. The longest head horn gives the beetle its common name, since it resembles an elephant’s trunk. Females have no horns. The horns are used for defense, and in competition among males for food and mates.

=== Size ===
In size, elephant beetles typically range between 7 and 12 cm (2.75–4.75 in), with the largest male specimen known measuring 13.7 cm, including the horn.

== Location ==
Elephant beetles are located in southern Mexico, Central America, and in South American rainforests.

== List of subspecies ==
- Megasoma elephas elephas (Fabricius, 1775)
- Megasoma elephas iijimai Nagai, 2003

== Breeding ==
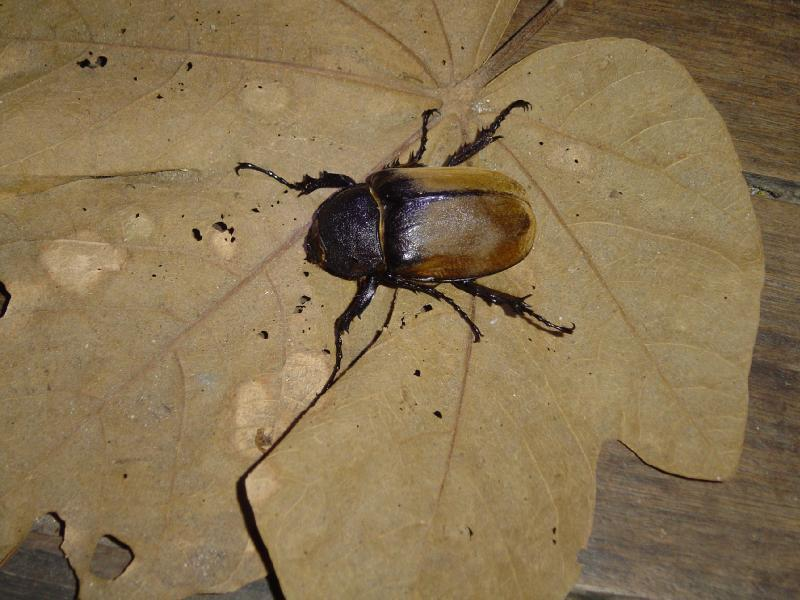
Female Megasoma elephas in Costa Rica

Elephant beetle larvae develop in large decaying logs and take up to three years to develop into adult beetles, depending upon the subspecies. The female elephant beetle lays her eggs inside the decaying log or in the ground. Some weeks after that (usually three) the eggs hatch into C-shaped larvae, white grubs with brown heads and six legs. The larval stage lasts around 29 months, during which time the grubs consume organic matter. The third and last stage, the pupal stage, lasts around five weeks at a temperature of 26 degrees Celsius. The life span of an adult elephant beetle is around one to three months.

== Food ==
For their diet, elephant beetles eat the sap of particular trees and ripened fallen fruits. In captivity, they also eat exotic fruits such as pineapples, longan, lychee fruit, and bark from certain trees like the poinciana.

== Behavior and habitat ==
Elephant beetles live in rainforests and are mainly active during the night. They are able to maintain a high internal body heat when foraging despite reduced ambient temperature.

Elephant beetle population has been depleted by the destruction of the rainforests, which has reduced their grounds for mating. In some countries such as Costa Rica, Nicaragua, and others in Central America the male's head is used as a charm necklace, decorated with gold. This has affected the population severely.

== Potential military use ==
As part of a Pentagon-sponsored project, researchers at the University of California, Berkeley have implanted electrodes into elephant beetle pupae. This allows some remote control of the adults’ flying behaviour.

== See also ==
- List of largest insects
