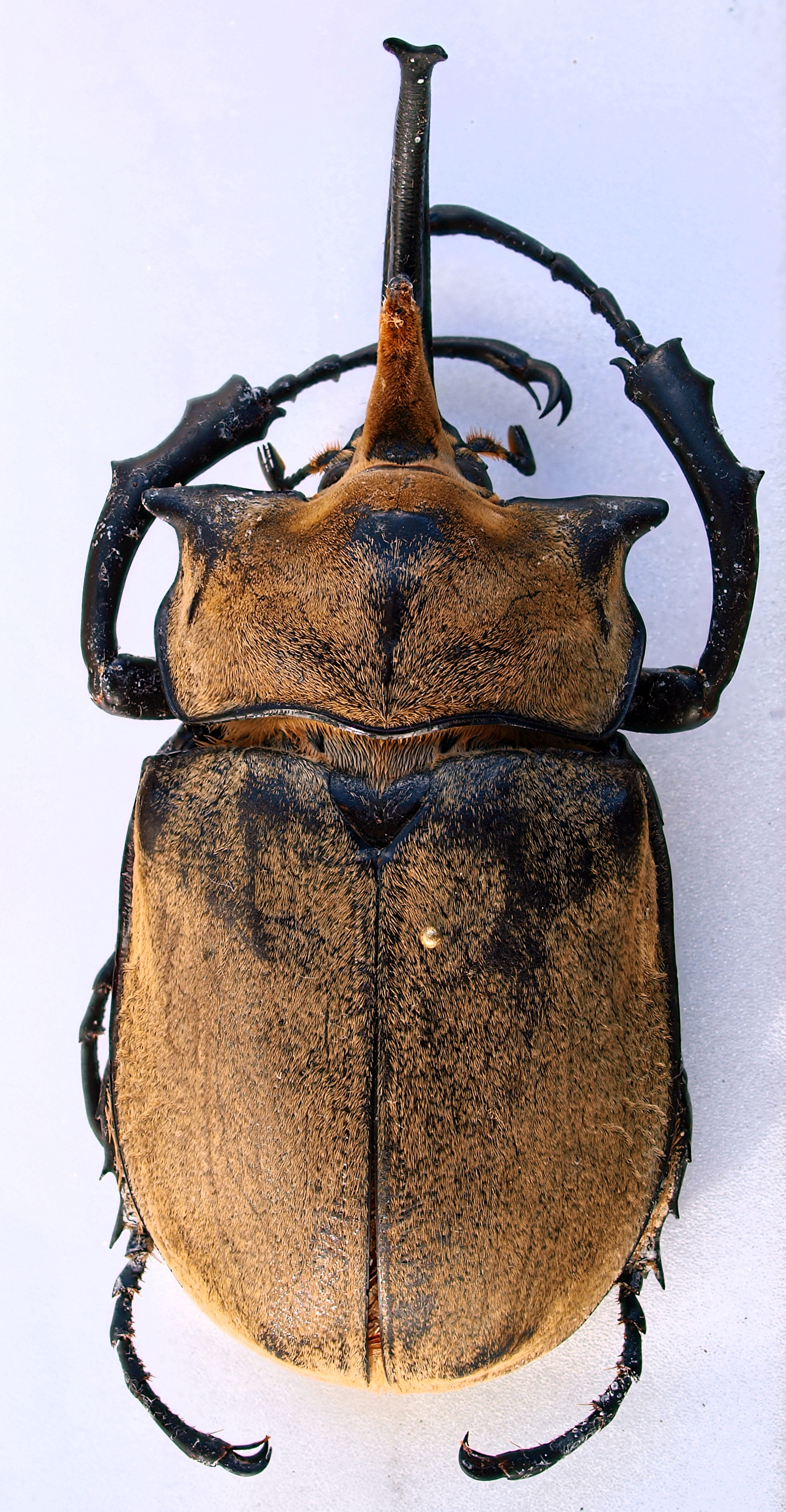
- Male Megasoma occidentale

Scientific classification
- Domain: Eukaryota
- Kingdom: Animalia
- Phylum: Arthropoda
- Class: Insecta
- Order: Coleoptera
- Suborder: Polyphaga
- Infraorder: Scarabaeiformia
- Family: Scarabaeidae
- Genus: Megasoma
- Species: M. occidentale

Binomial name
- Megasoma occidentale Bolívar y Pieltain, Jiménez-Asúa & Martínez, 1963

Synonyms
- Megasoma occidentalis

= Megasoma occidentale =

Species of beetle

Megasoma occidentale is a species of scarab beetle. It is endemic to Mexico and is known from the Oaxaca and Sinaloa states. Adults are attracted by light. Larvae have been collected in rotten coconut palm stems.
