= Pseudocotalpa andrewsi =

Conservation status
- Critically Imperiled (NatureServe)

Scientific classification
- Kingdom: Animalia
- Phylum: Arthropoda
- Clade: Pancrustacea
- Class: Insecta
- Order: Coleoptera
- Suborder: Polyphaga
- Infraorder: Scarabaeiformia
- Family: Scarabaeidae
- Genus: Pseudocotalpa
- Species: P. andrewsi

Binomial name
- Pseudocotalpa andrewsi Hardy, 1971

Species of beetle

Pseudocotalpa andrewsi, known generally as the Andrews dune scarab beetle or Andrews dune beetle, is a species of shining leaf chafer in the family Scarabaeidae.

== Distribution ==
The species is endemic to the Algodones Dunes in California. It is associated with Hymenoclea shrubs, though the reason for this is unclear.

== Behaviour ==
Adults fly above the sand for around half an hour each evening. They are not likely to travel long distances. Adults are mainly active from February to April, and burrow in sand when not active.

== Conservation ==
The species is threatened by use of off-road vehicles.
