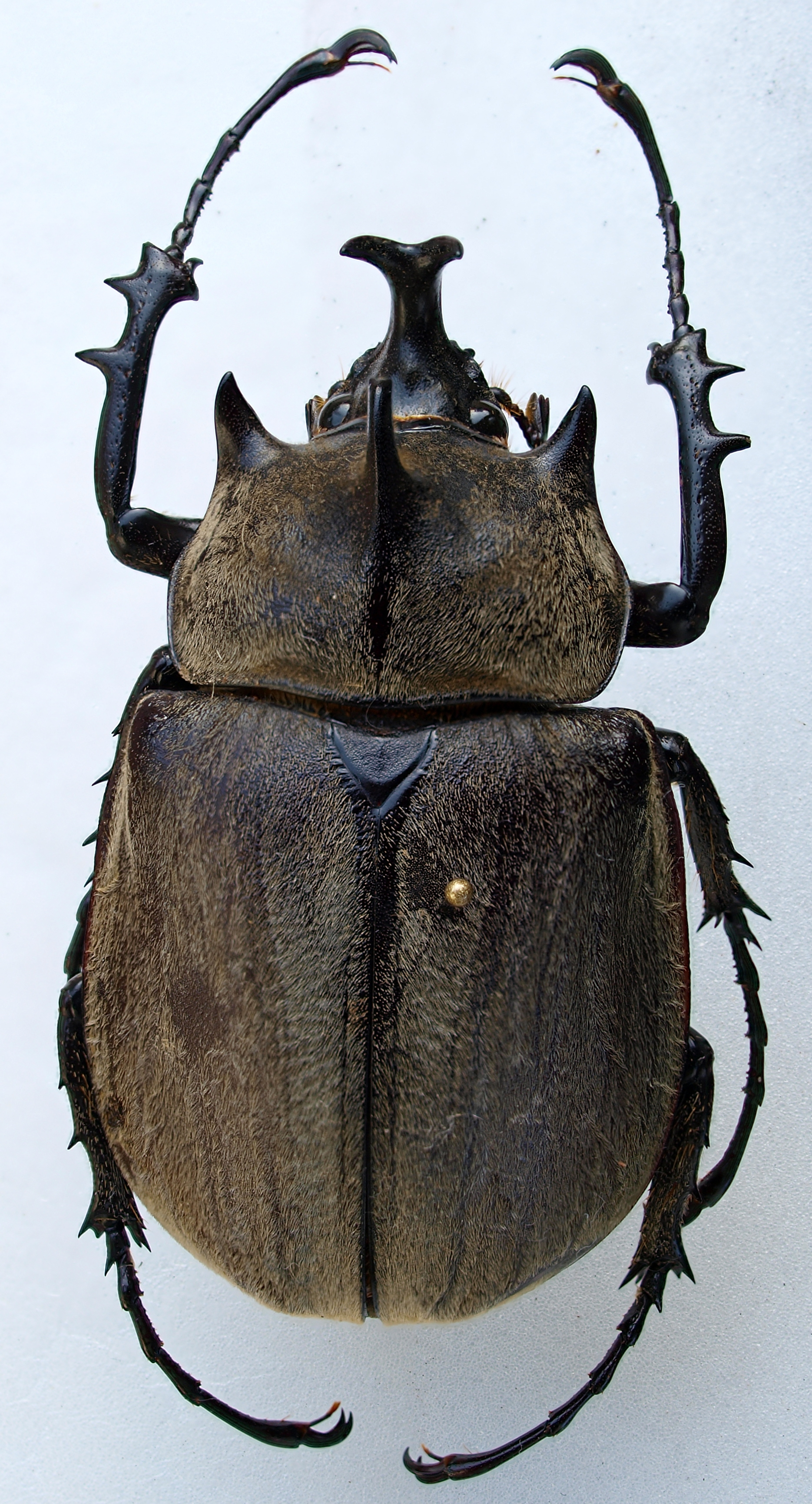

Scientific classification
- Kingdom: Animalia
- Phylum: Arthropoda
- Class: Insecta
- Order: Coleoptera
- Suborder: Polyphaga
- Infraorder: Scarabaeiformia
- Family: Scarabaeidae
- Genus: Megasoma
- Species: M. gyas

Binomial name
- Megasoma gyas (Herbst, 1785)

Synonyms
- Scarabaeus Goliath Voet, 1766 (Unav.); Scarabaeus gyas Herbst, 1785; Scarabaeus esau Herbst, 1785; Scarabaeus laniger Olivier, 1789; Megasoma gyas rumbucheri Fischer, 1968

= Megasoma gyas =

Species of beetle

Megasoma gyas is a species of large Neotropical rhinoceros beetles. There are no recognized subspecies.

== Description ==
Megasoma gyas have setae all over their bodies. Males have three thoracic horns and one cephalic horn. Females are without horns.
