= Megasoma cedrosa =

Scientific classification
- Kingdom: Animalia
- Phylum: Arthropoda
- Clade: Pancrustacea
- Class: Insecta
- Order: Coleoptera
- Suborder: Polyphaga
- Infraorder: Scarabaeiformia
- Family: Scarabaeidae
- Genus: Megasoma
- Species: M. cedrosa

Binomial name
- Megasoma cedrosa Hardy, 1972

Synonyms
- Megasoma lenczyi Cartwright, 1976; Megasoma cedrosum; Megasoma cedros

Species of beetle

Megasoma cedrosa is a species of rhinoceros beetle. It is endemic to Mexico and described originally from Cedros Island. The name is often misspelled as "cedrosum" or "cedros" but the original spelling (as cedrosa) is retained under ICZN Article 31.2.3, as the name is neither Latin nor Greek.
