= Megasoma vogti =

Scientific classification
- Domain: Eukaryota
- Kingdom: Animalia
- Phylum: Arthropoda
- Class: Insecta
- Order: Coleoptera
- Suborder: Polyphaga
- Infraorder: Scarabaeiformia
- Family: Scarabaeidae
- Genus: Megasoma
- Species: M. vogti

Binomial name
- Megasoma vogti Cartwright, 1963

Species of beetle

Megasoma vogti, known generally as the Texas elephant beetle or Texas megasoma, is a species of rhinoceros beetle in the family Scarabaeidae.
