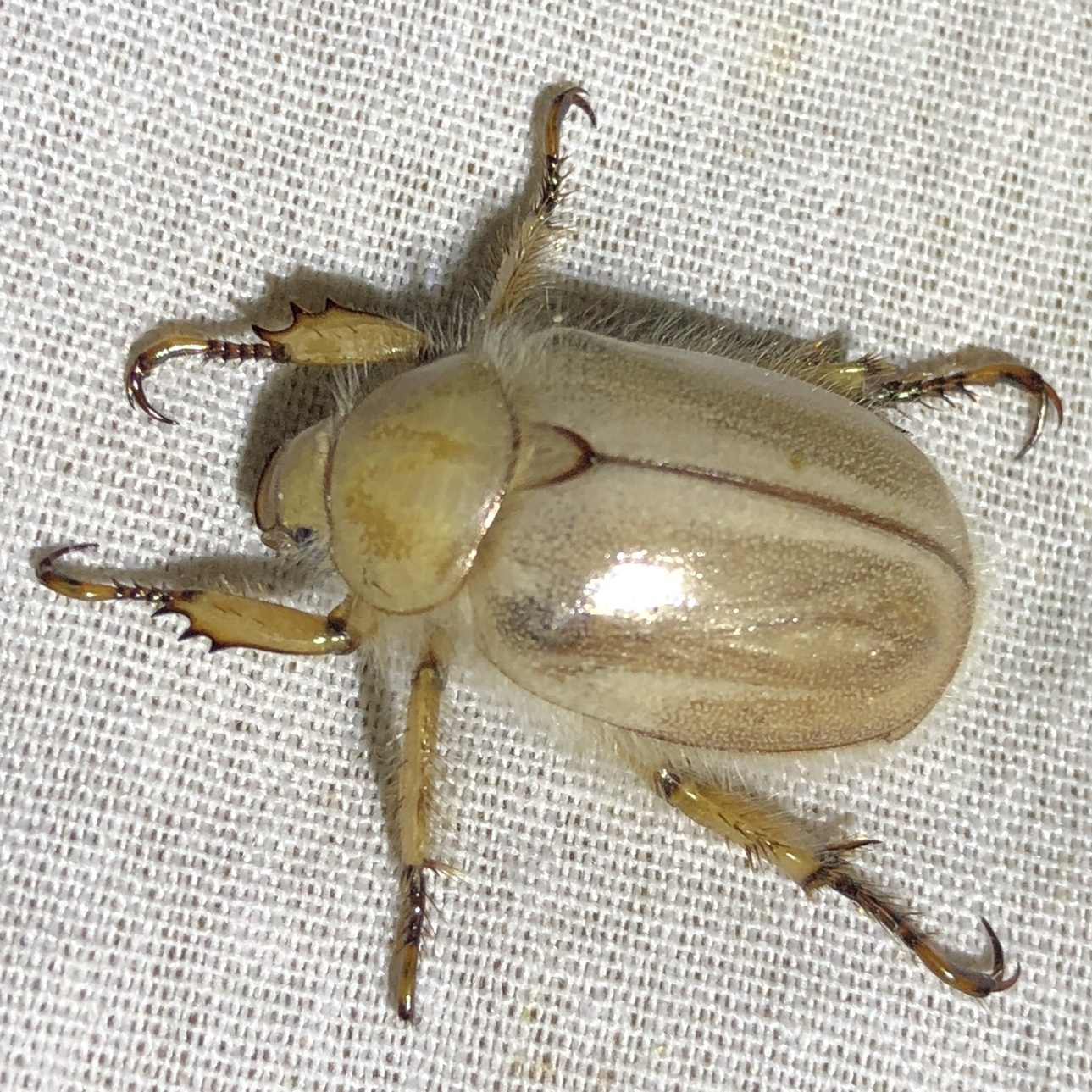
- Pseudocotalpa sonorica

Scientific classification
- Kingdom: Animalia
- Phylum: Arthropoda
- Clade: Pancrustacea
- Class: Insecta
- Order: Coleoptera
- Suborder: Polyphaga
- Infraorder: Scarabaeiformia
- Family: Scarabaeidae
- Tribe: Rutelini
- Genus: Pseudocotalpa; Hardy, 1971

Species
- Pseudocotalpa andrewsi Hardy, 1971; Pseudocotalpa giulianii Hardy, 1974; Pseudocotalpa sonorica Hardy, 1974

= Pseudocotalpa =

Genus of beetles

Pseudocotalpa is a small genus of sand dune-inhabiting beetles in the family Scarabaeidae, endemic to deserts of western North America.

Pseudocotalpa are robust-bodied beetles that can reach 25 mm (1.0 in) in length.
