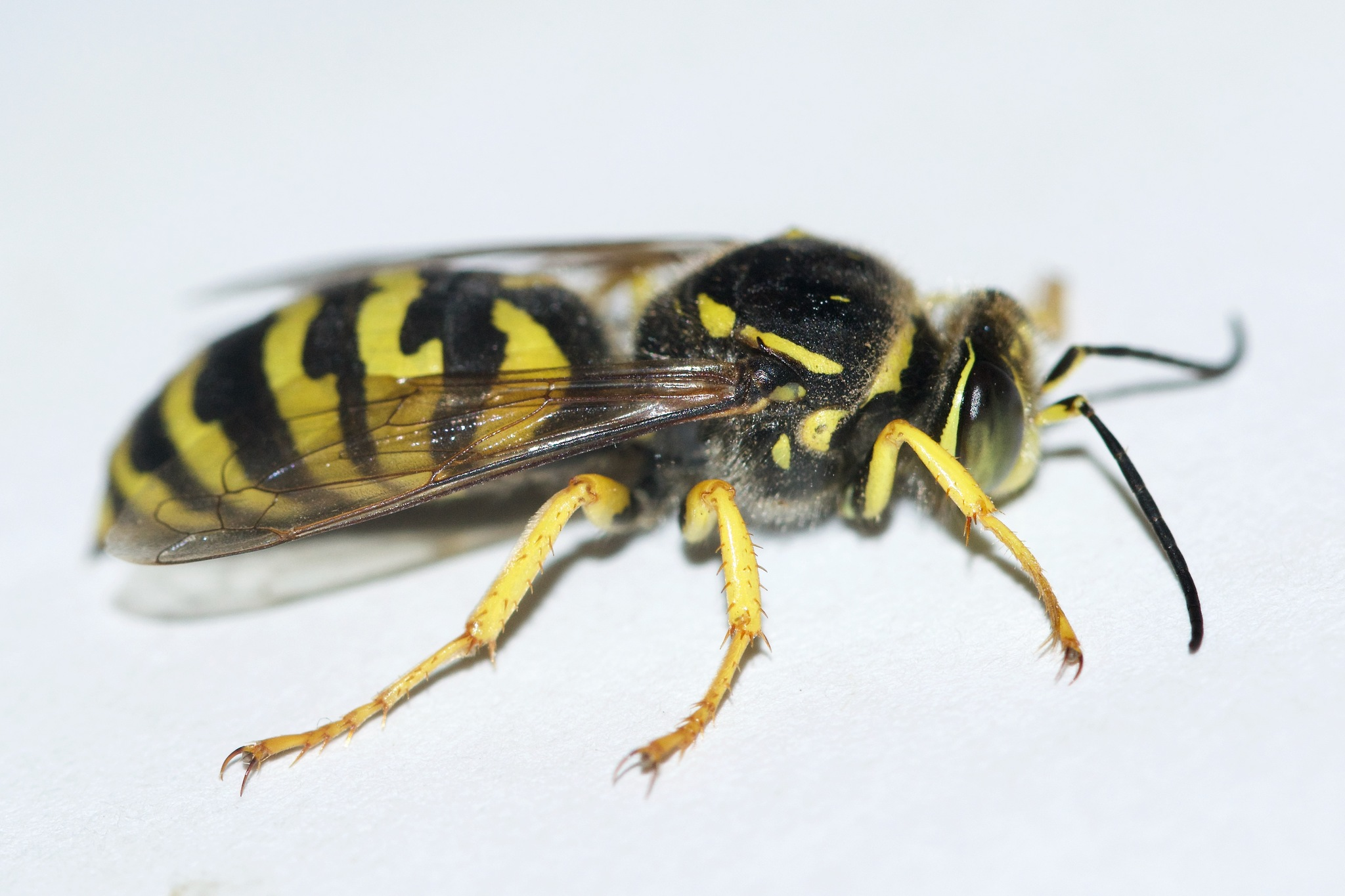
- Stictiella emarginata, Canada

Scientific classification
- Domain: Eukaryota
- Kingdom: Animalia
- Phylum: Arthropoda
- Class: Insecta
- Order: Hymenoptera
- Family: Bembicidae
- Genus: Stictiella
- Species: S. emarginata

Binomial name
- Stictiella emarginata (Cresson, 1865)

Synonyms
- Monedula emarginata Cresson, 1865; Monedula mamillata Handlirsch, 1890; Stictiella fairchildi R. Bohart, 1982

= Stictiella emarginata =

Species of wasp

Stictiella emarginata is a species of sand wasp in the family Bembicidae. It is found in North America.
