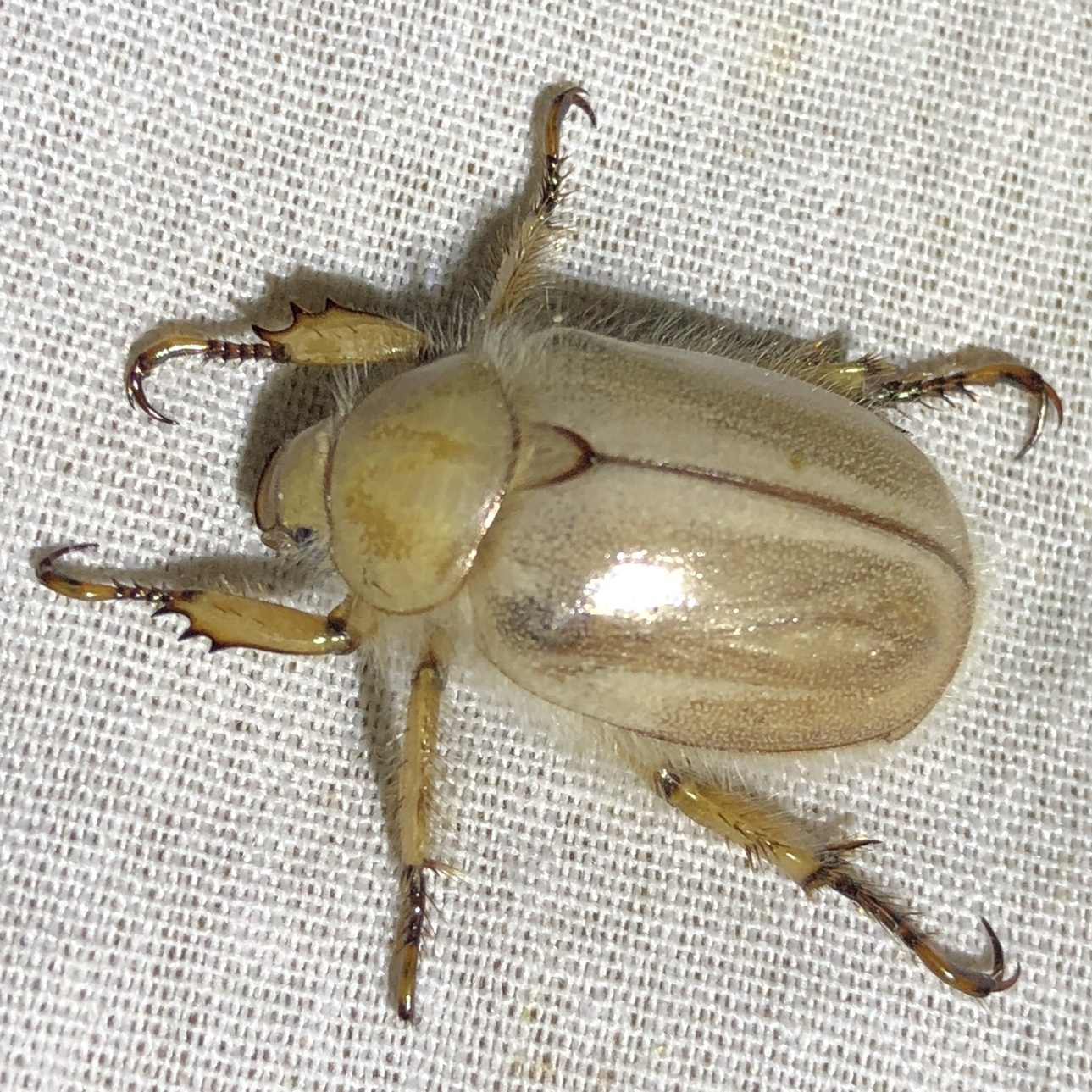

Scientific classification
- Kingdom: Animalia
- Phylum: Arthropoda
- Clade: Pancrustacea
- Class: Insecta
- Order: Coleoptera
- Suborder: Polyphaga
- Infraorder: Scarabaeiformia
- Family: Scarabaeidae
- Genus: Pseudocotalpa
- Species: P. sonorica

Binomial name
- Pseudocotalpa sonorica Hardy, 1974

= Pseudocotalpa sonorica =

Species of beetle

Pseudocotalpa sonorica is a species of shining leaf chafer in the family of beetles known as Scarabaeidae. It is endemic to the Algodones Dunes in North America.

Pseudocotalpa sonorica holotype is a male measuring 21 mm (0.8 in) in length.
