= Stictiella villegasi =

Scientific classification
- Domain: Eukaryota
- Kingdom: Animalia
- Phylum: Arthropoda
- Class: Insecta
- Order: Hymenoptera
- Family: Bembicidae
- Tribe: Bembicini
- Subtribe: Stictiellina
- Genus: Stictiella
- Species: S. villegasi

Binomial name
- Stictiella villegasi R. Bohart, 1982

Species of wasp

Stictiella villegasi, the Algodones sand wasp, is a species of sand wasp in the family Bembicidae. It is endemic to the Algodones Dunes in North America.
