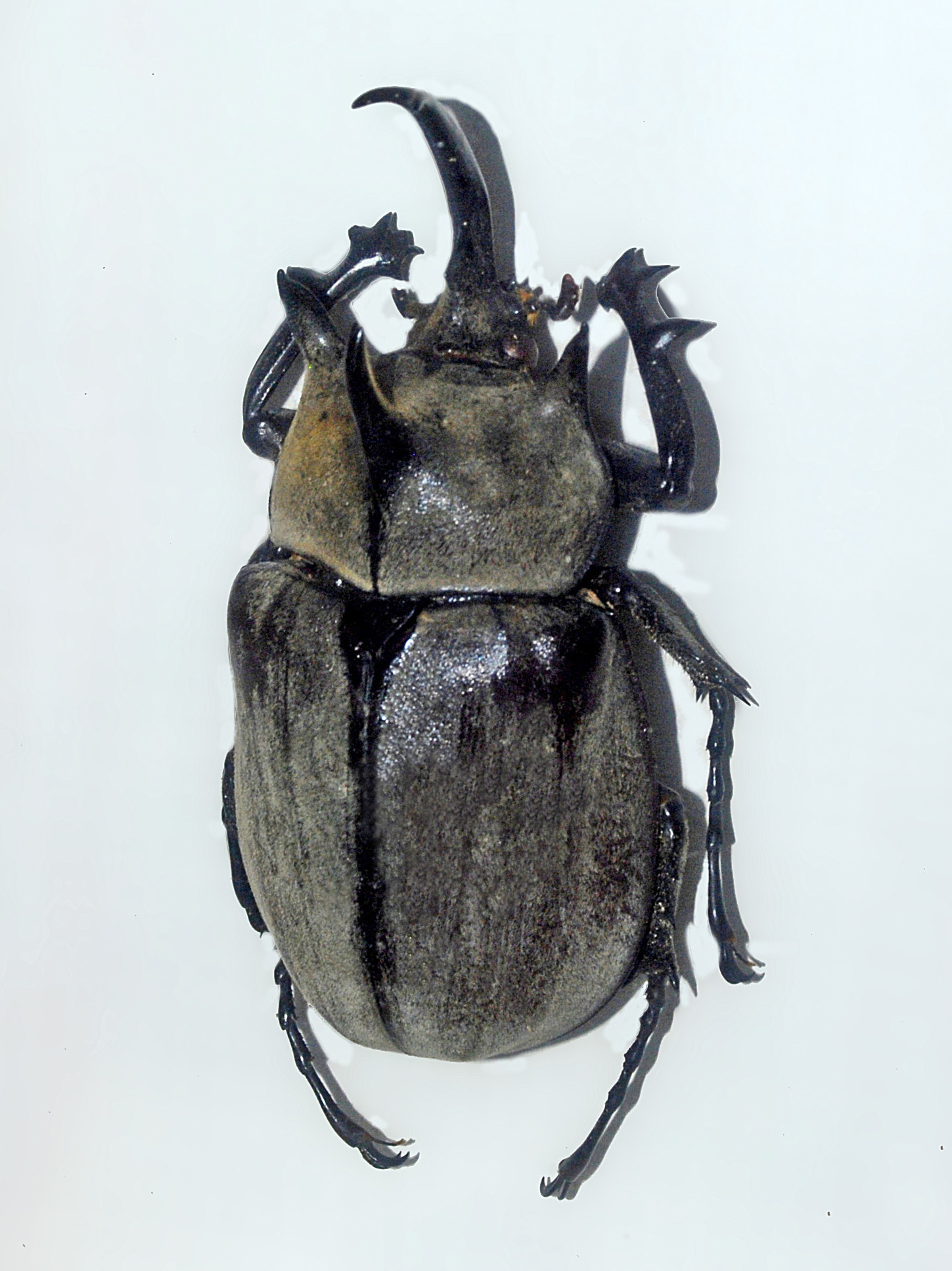
- Male of Megasoma anubis from Brazil

Scientific classification
- Kingdom: Animalia
- Phylum: Arthropoda
- Clade: Pancrustacea
- Class: Insecta
- Order: Coleoptera
- Suborder: Polyphaga
- Infraorder: Scarabaeiformia
- Family: Scarabaeidae
- Genus: Megasoma
- Species: M. anubis

Binomial name
- Megasoma anubis (Chevrolat, 1836)

Synonyms
- Scarabaeus hector Gory, 1836; Scarabaeus theseus Laporte, 1840

= Megasoma anubis =

Species of beetle

Megasoma anubis is a species of beetles belonging to the family Scarabaeidae.

== Description ==
Megasoma anubis can reach a length of about 90 millimetres (3.5 in) (including horn). These large and heavy beetles are black but they have a soft, velvety surface, as they are densely covered with a yellowish-grey dust. Males are much larger than females and have a medium length and curved horn on the head. On pronotum there is a short median horn. Females lack horns. The legs are relatively long with sharp claws.

These beetles are considered a pest. The larvae live and develop in 1–2 years. They feed on the inflorescence of the Chinese fan palm (Livistona chinensis). Adults mainly feed on rotting fruits and can be found from January to April.

== Distribution ==
This species has a Neotropical distribution (Brazil).

== Gallery ==
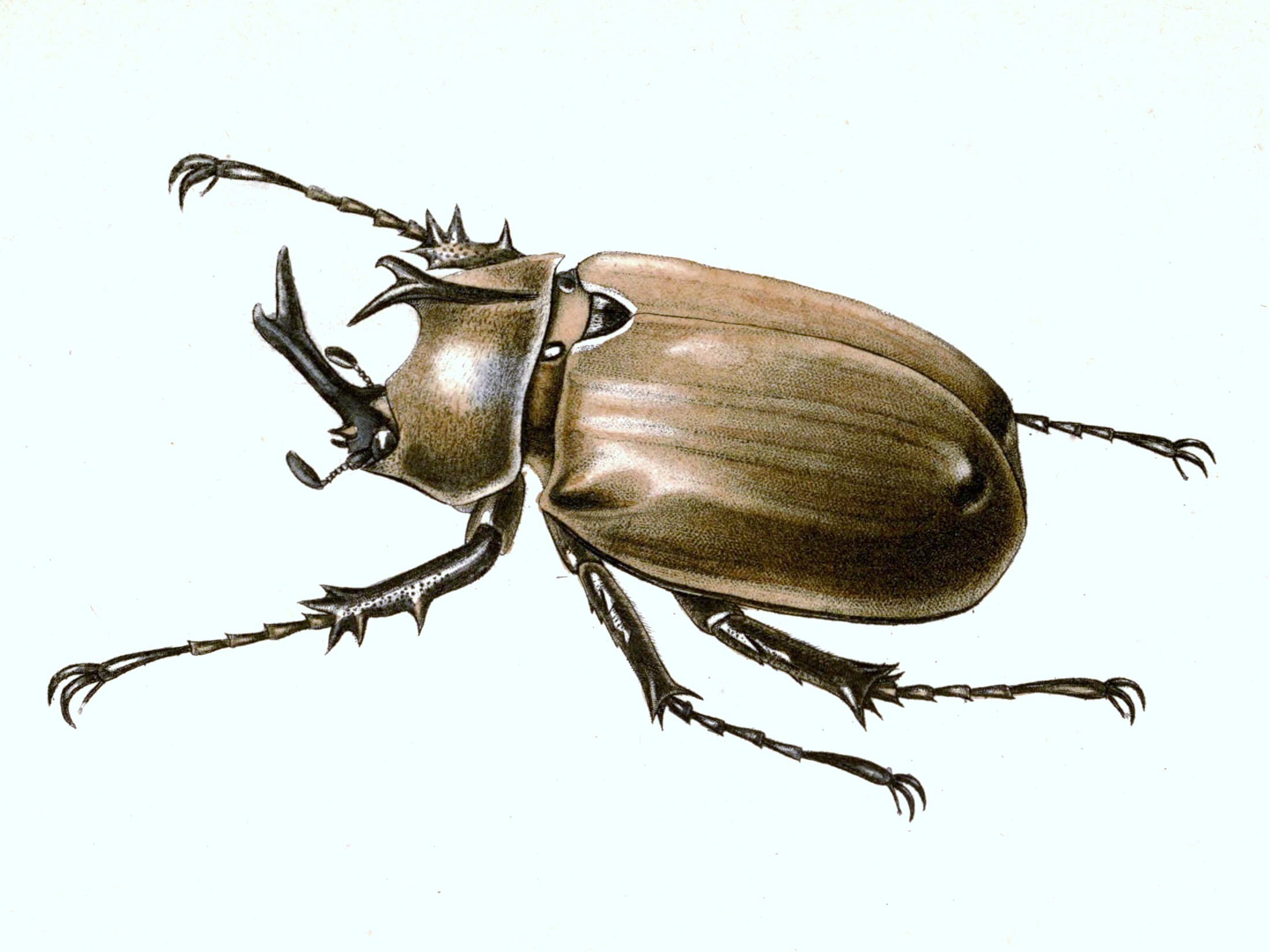
Illustration of Megasoma anubis (male)

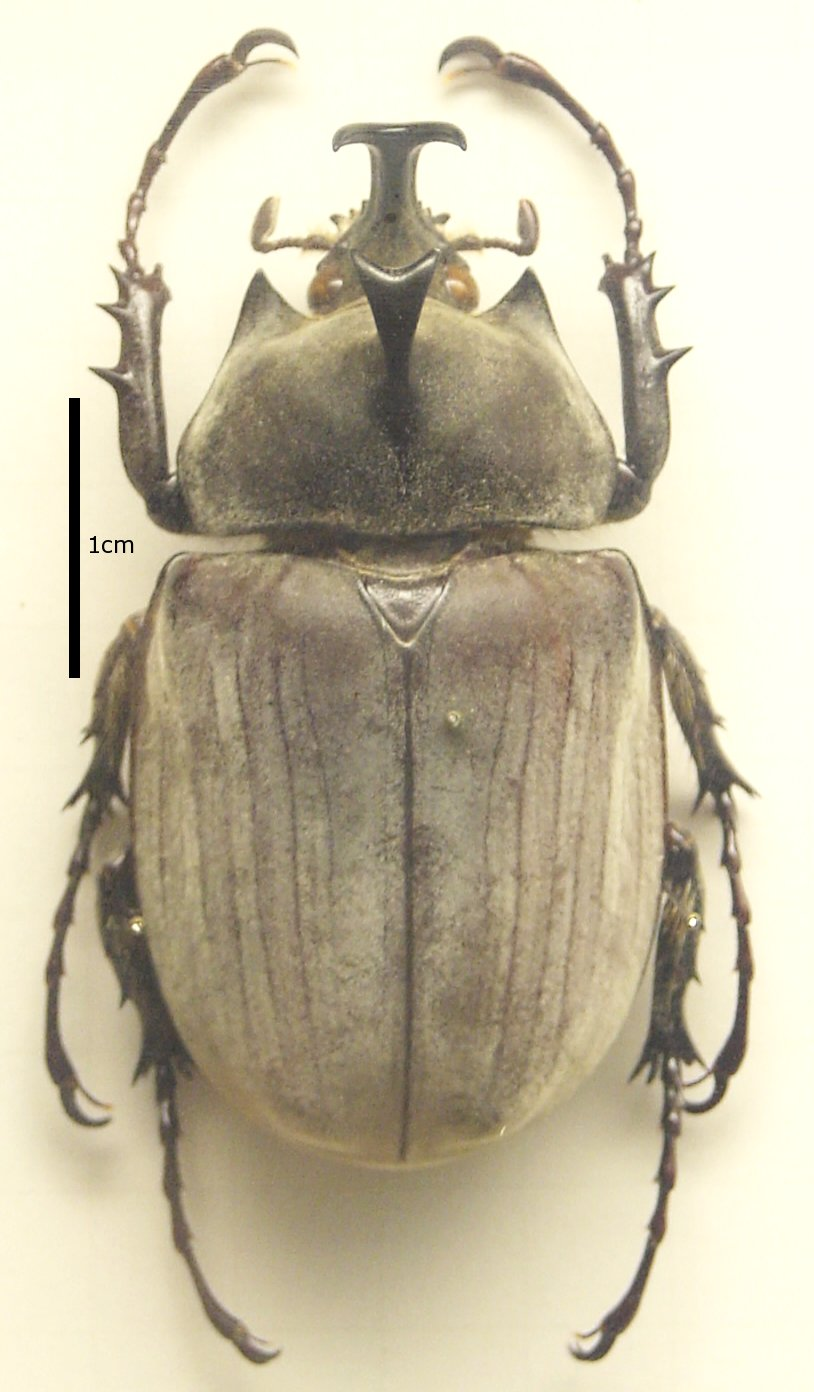
Mounted specimen from Brazil
