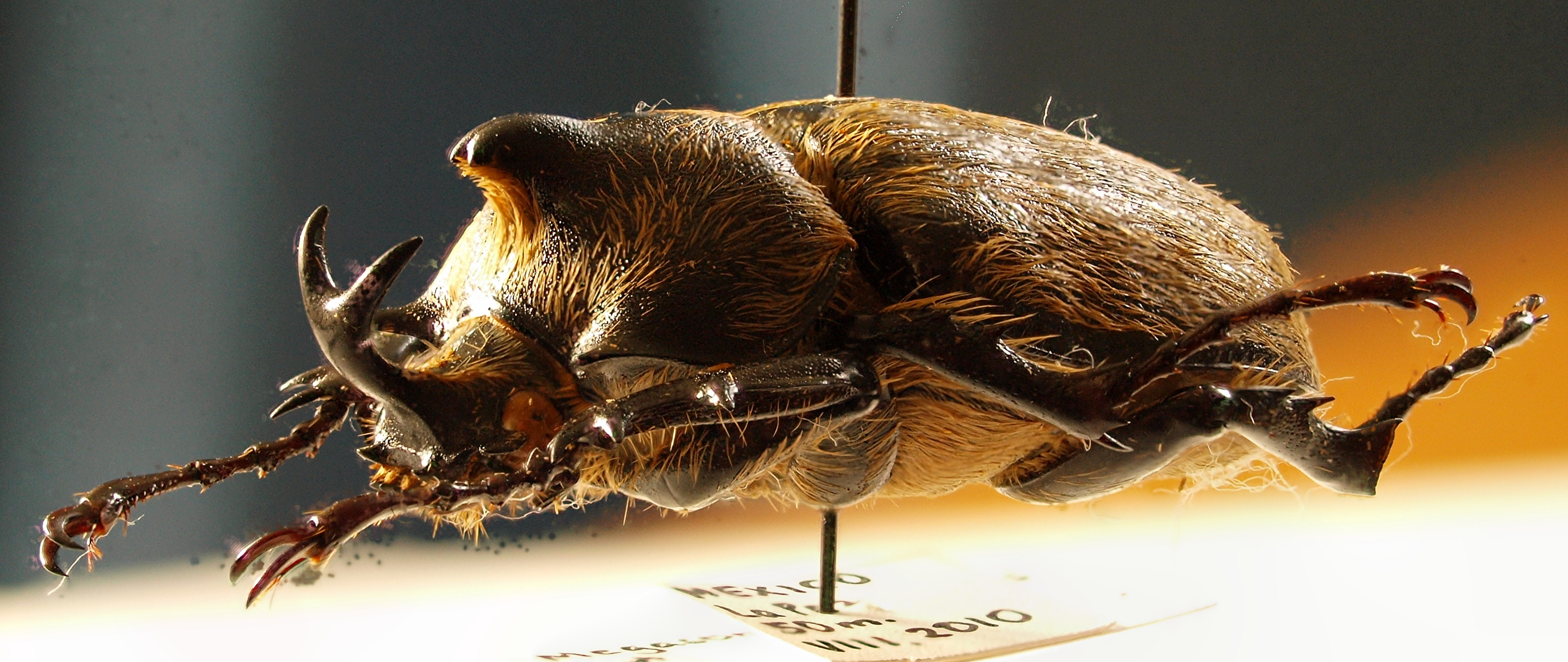
- Male Megasoma thersites

Scientific classification
- Domain: Eukaryota
- Kingdom: Animalia
- Phylum: Arthropoda
- Class: Insecta
- Order: Coleoptera
- Suborder: Polyphaga
- Infraorder: Scarabaeiformia
- Family: Scarabaeidae
- Genus: Megasoma
- Species: M. thersites

Binomial name
- Megasoma thersites LeConte, 1861

= Megasoma thersites =

Species of beetle

Megasoma thersites is a species of scarab beetle. It is endemic to Baja California, Mexico. Adults are attracted by light and feed on the cambium of palo verde (Parkinsonia florida subsp. peninsulare).
