= Stictiella formosa =

Scientific classification
- Domain: Eukaryota
- Kingdom: Animalia
- Phylum: Arthropoda
- Class: Insecta
- Order: Hymenoptera
- Family: Bembicidae
- Subfamily: Bembicinae
- Tribe: Bembicini
- Subtribe: Stictiellina
- Genus: Stictiella
- Species: S. formosa

Binomial name
- Stictiella formosa Cresson, 1873

Synonyms
- Monedula formosa Cresson, 1873

Species of wasp

Stictiella formosa is a species of sand wasp in the order Hymenoptera. The distribution range of Stictiella formosa includes Central America and North America.
