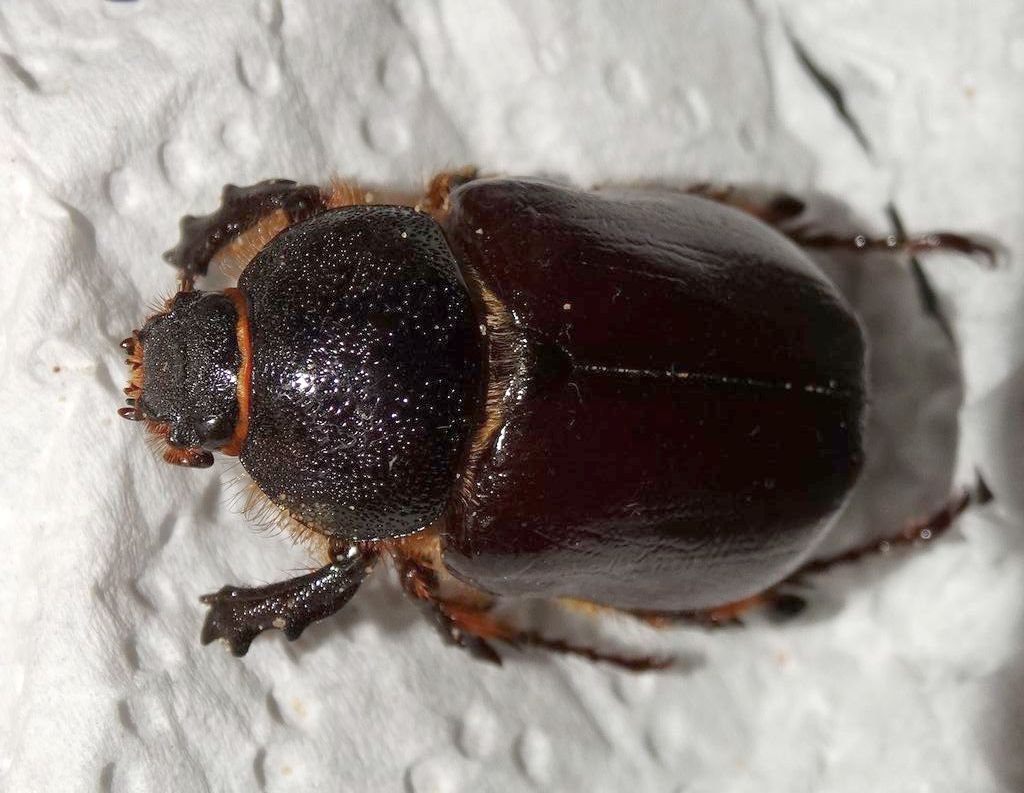
- Female

Scientific classification
- Domain: Eukaryota
- Kingdom: Animalia
- Phylum: Arthropoda
- Class: Insecta
- Order: Coleoptera
- Suborder: Polyphaga
- Infraorder: Scarabaeiformia
- Family: Scarabaeidae
- Genus: Megasoma
- Species: M. sleeperi

Binomial name
- Megasoma sleeperi Hardy, 1972

= Megasoma sleeperi =

Species of beetle

Megasoma sleeperi is a species of rhinoceros beetle in the family Scarabaeidae. It is endemic to the Algodones Dunes in North America.
