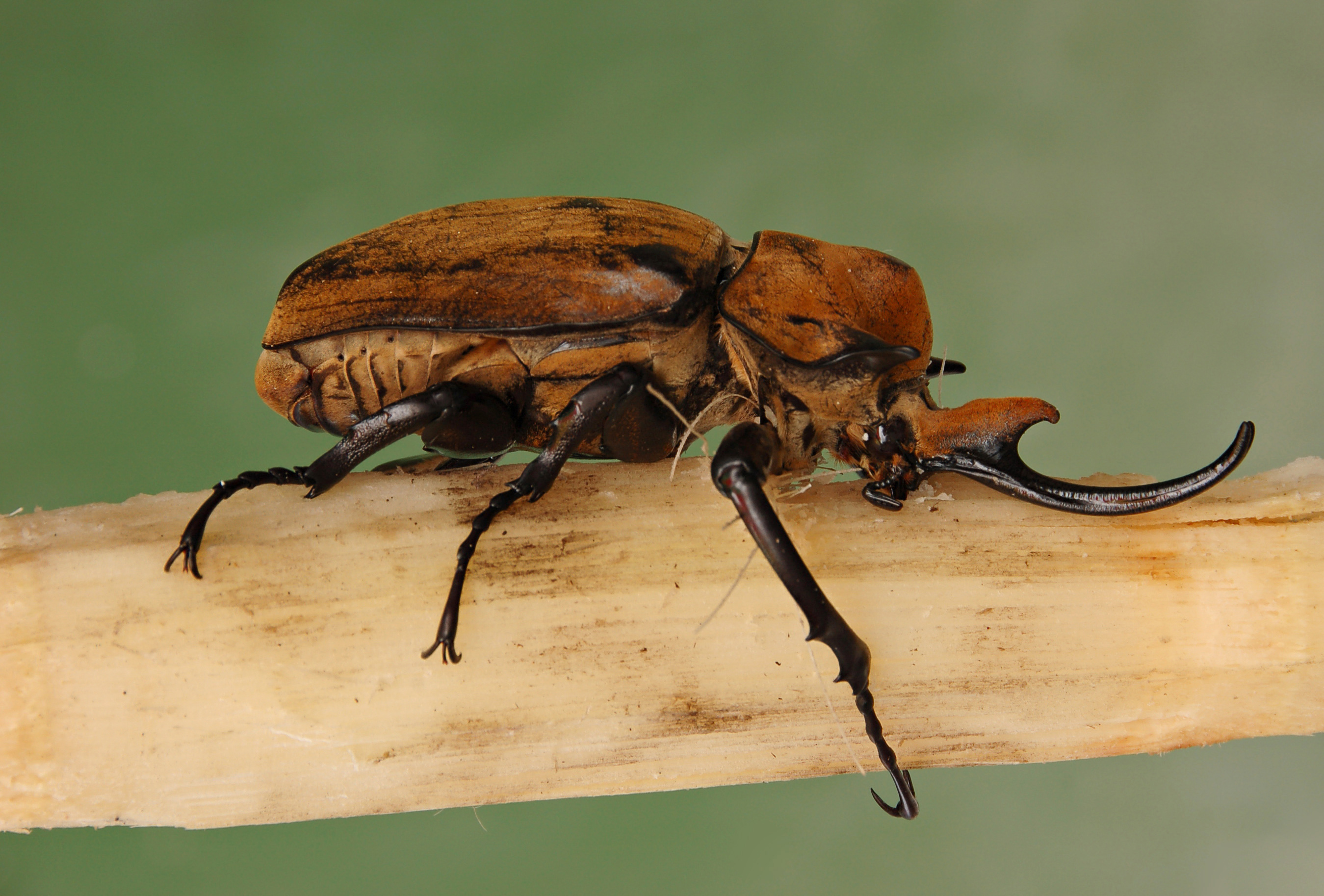
- Megasoma elephas, the elephant beetle

Scientific classification
- Kingdom: Animalia
- Phylum: Arthropoda
- Clade: Pancrustacea
- Class: Insecta
- Order: Coleoptera
- Suborder: Polyphaga
- Infraorder: Scarabaeiformia
- Family: Scarabaeidae
- Subfamily: Dynastinae
- Tribe: Dynastini
- Genus: Megasoma; Kirby, 1825

Type species
- Megasoma actaeon (Linnaeus, 1758)

Synonyms
- Megalosoma Burmeister, 1847; Megasominus Casey, 1915; Lycophontes Bruch, 1910

= Megasoma =

Genus of beetles

Megasoma is a genus of rhinoceros beetles. Commonly known as the elephant beetles, Megasoma species are found from the southern half of North America to most of South America.

== Appearance ==
Megasoma are generally large in size (as indicated by the name, which is "large body" in Greek). As a group, the genus contains some of the largest beetle species known. However, there are small species of this genus as well. The largest can be up to 135 mm, while small ones like Megasoma punctulatum can be around 20 mm.

Many Megasoma species (Megasoma elephas, Megasoma thersites, Megasoma gyas, Megasoma cedrosa, Megasoma anubis, Megasoma occidentale, Megasoma joergenseni, Megasoma vogti) have thin microscopic hairs (setae) covering nearly their entire bodies, giving the appearance of being pale or orange.

Males of most species have large horns that they use to wrestle with other males. Females do not have horns.

== Etymology ==
The name Megasoma can be translated as being formed from the Ancient Greek μέγας (megas), meaning "large", and σῶμα (sôma), meaning "body".

== Diet ==
Larvae feed on tree or shrub roots. Adults usually drink tree sap or suck juice from fruit.

== Behavior and habitat ==
Adult Megasoma are nocturnal and are attracted to lights, and are often seen resting in trees.

== Species list ==
- Megasoma actaeon (Linnaeus, 1758)
- Megasoma anubis (Chevrolat, 1836)
- Megasoma bollei (Dechambre, 2006)
- Megasoma cedrosa Hardy, 1972
- Megasoma elephas (Fabricius, 1775)
- Megasoma gyas (Herbst, 1785)
- Megasoma hermes Prandi, 2016
- Megasoma hyperion Prandi, Grossi & Vaz-de-Mello, 2020
- Megasoma joergenseni Bruch, 1910
- Megasoma lecontei Hardy, 1972
- Megasoma mars (Reiche, 1852)
- Megasoma nogueirai Morón, 2005
- Megasoma occidentale Bolivar, Pieltain, Jimenez-asua & Martinez, 1963
- Megasoma pachecoi Cartwright, 1963
- Megasoma punctulatum Cartwright, 1952
- Megasoma rex Prandi, 2018* (considered a likely synonym of M. actaeon - see)
- Megasoma sleeperi Hardy, 1972
- Megasoma svobodaorum Krajcik, 2009
- Megasoma thersites LeConte, 1861
- Megasoma typhon (Olivier, 1789)
- Megasoma vazdemelloi Prandi, 2018
- Megasoma vogti Cartwright, 1963

== See also ==
- List of largest insects
