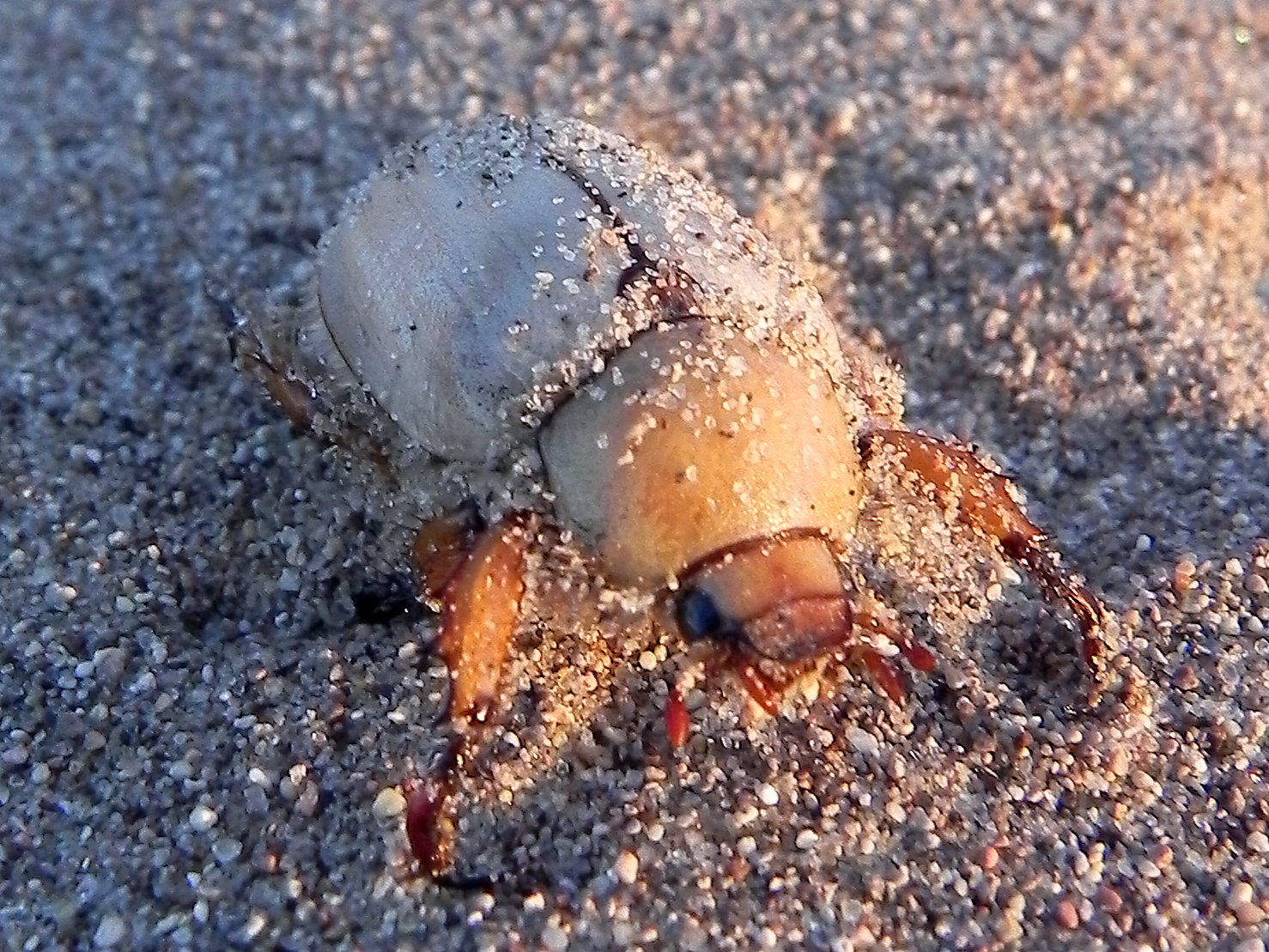

Conservation status
- Vulnerable (IUCN 2.3)

Scientific classification
- Kingdom: Animalia
- Phylum: Arthropoda
- Clade: Pancrustacea
- Class: Insecta
- Order: Coleoptera
- Suborder: Polyphaga
- Infraorder: Scarabaeiformia
- Family: Scarabaeidae
- Genus: Pseudocotalpa
- Species: P. giulianii

Binomial name
- Pseudocotalpa giulianii Hardy, 1974

= Pseudocotalpa giulianii =

Species of beetle

Pseudocotalpa giulianii, also known as Giuliani's dune scarab and Giuliani's dune scarab beetle, is a species of sand dune-inhabiting beetle in the family Scarabaeidae. It is endemic to Nevada, the United States. It is named for Derham Giuliani who first collected this species from the Amargosa Desert.

Pseudocotalpa giulianii males measure 17–25 mm (0.7–1.0 in) and females 14–22 mm (0.6–0.9 in) in length.
