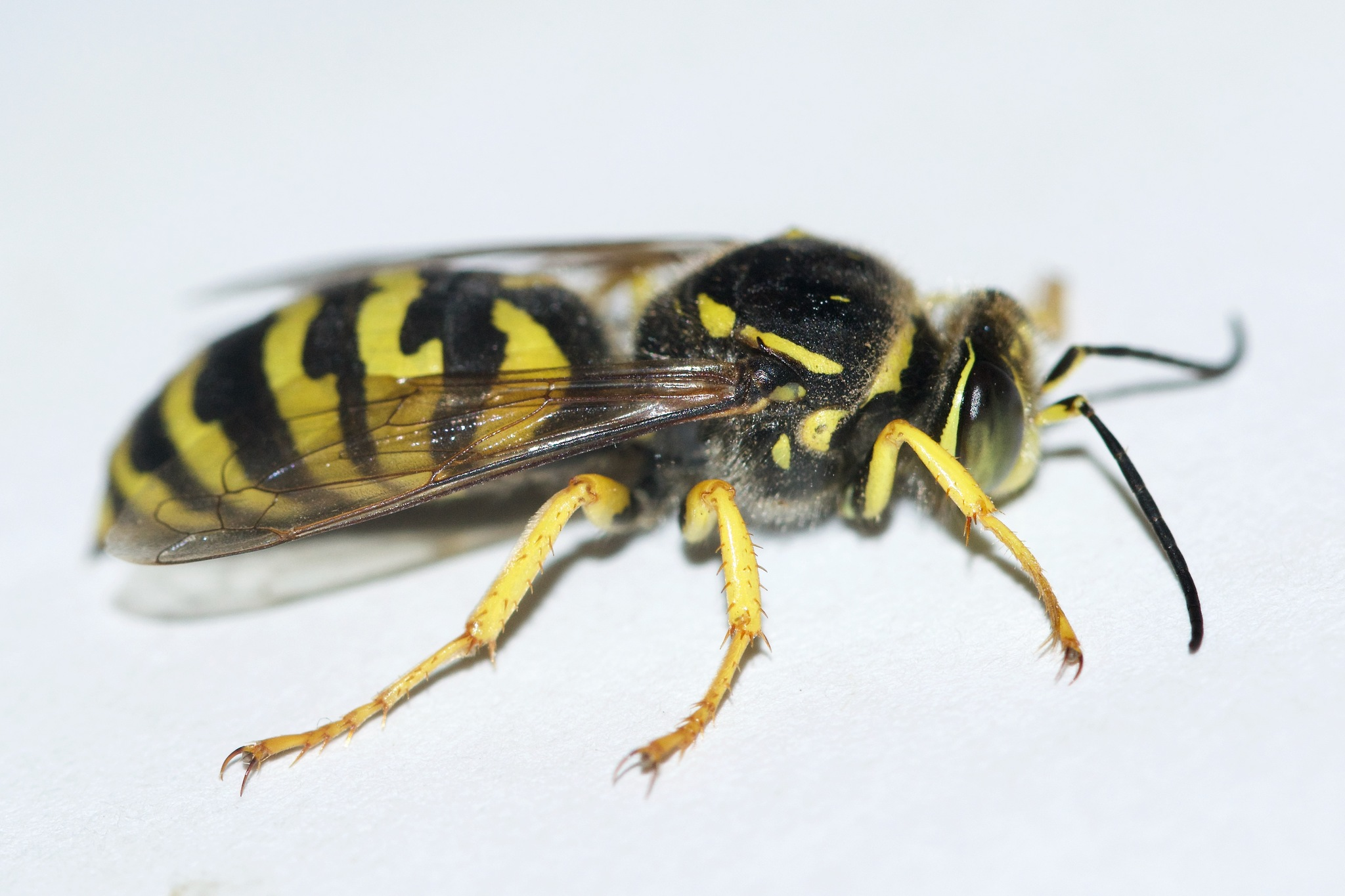
- Stictiella emarginata, Canada

Scientific classification
- Domain: Eukaryota
- Kingdom: Animalia
- Phylum: Arthropoda
- Class: Insecta
- Order: Hymenoptera
- Family: Bembicidae
- Subfamily: Bembicinae
- Tribe: Bembicini
- Subtribe: Stictiellina
- Genus: Stictiella

= Stictiella =

Genus of wasps

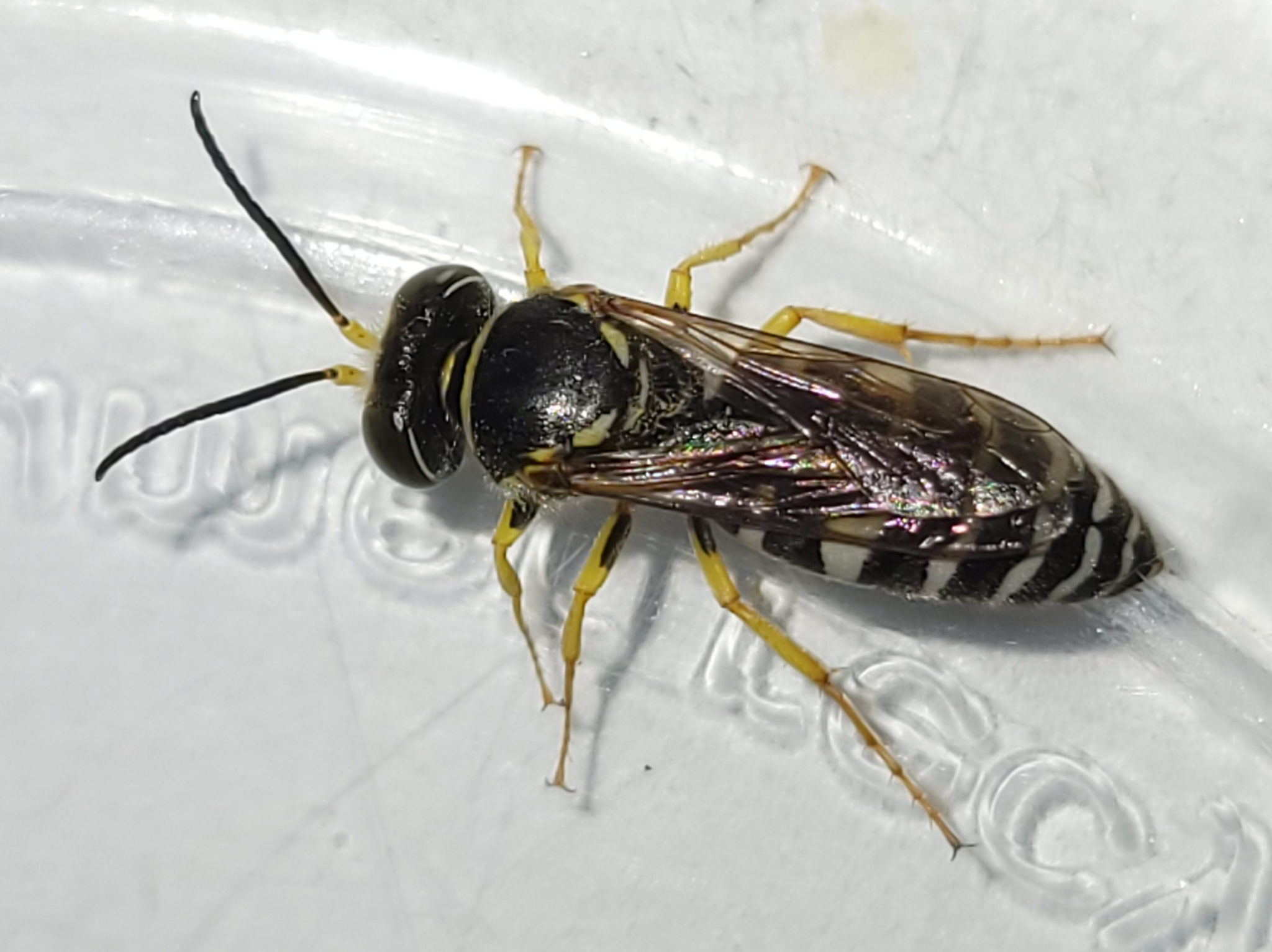
Stictiella pulchella, Florida

Stictiella is a genus of sand wasps in the family Bembicidae. There are at least 14 described species in Stictiella.

== Species ==
- Stictiella boharti Gillaspy, 1985
- Stictiella callista J. Parker, 1917
- Stictiella corniculata Mickel, 1918
- Stictiella emarginata (Cresson, 1865)
- Stictiella evansi Gillaspy, 1961
- Stictiella fergusoni R. Bohart, 1985
- Stictiella flavescens Gillaspy, 1985
- Stictiella formosa (Cresson, 1873)
- Stictiella gillaspyi R. Bohart, 1982
- Stictiella pulchella (Cresson, 1865)
- Stictiella speciosa (Cresson, 1865)
- Stictiella spinifera (Mickel, 1916)
- Stictiella tuberculata (W. Fox, 1895)
- Stictiella villegasi R. Bohart, 1982 (algodones sand wasp)
