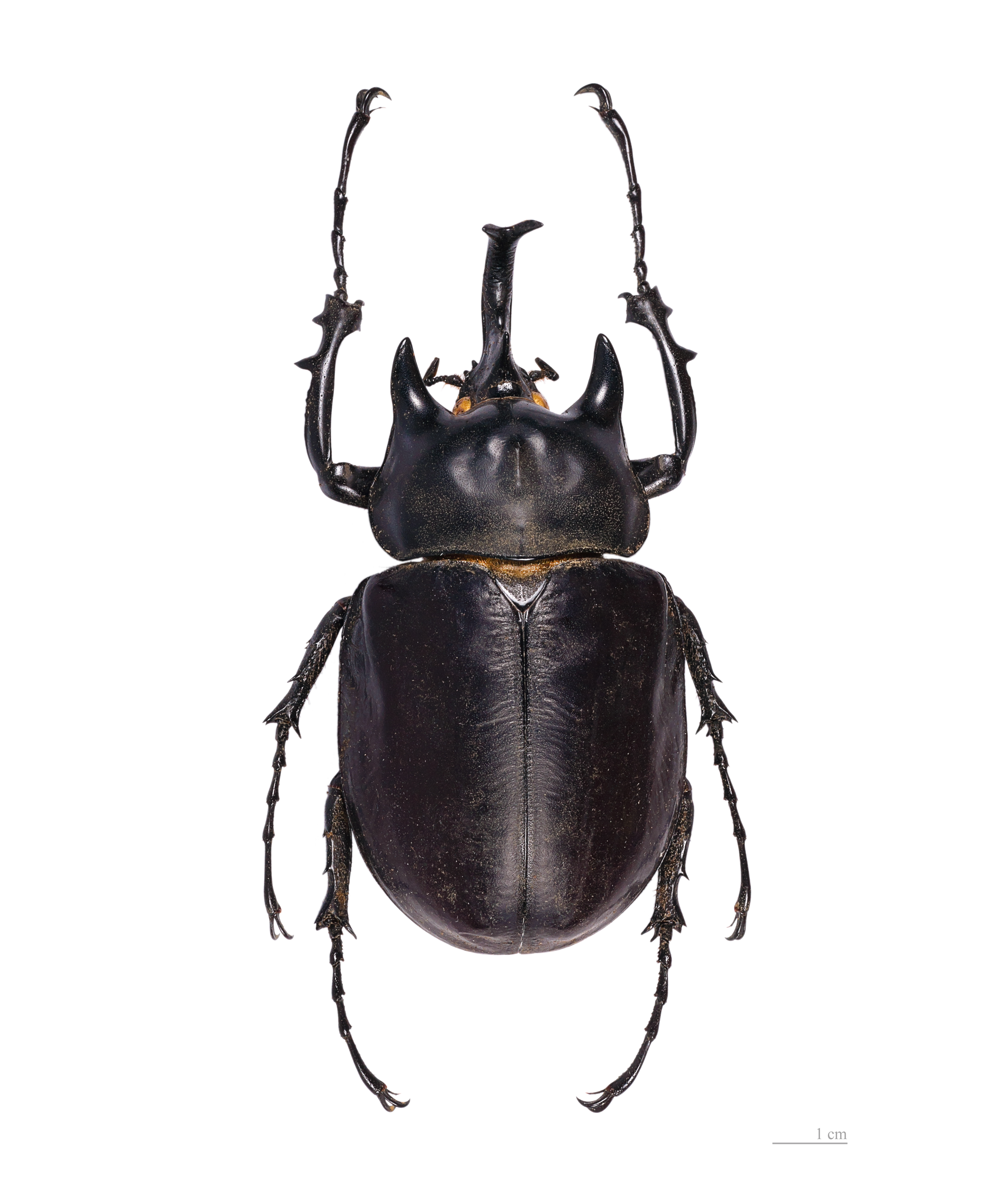
- Male of Megasoma actaeon
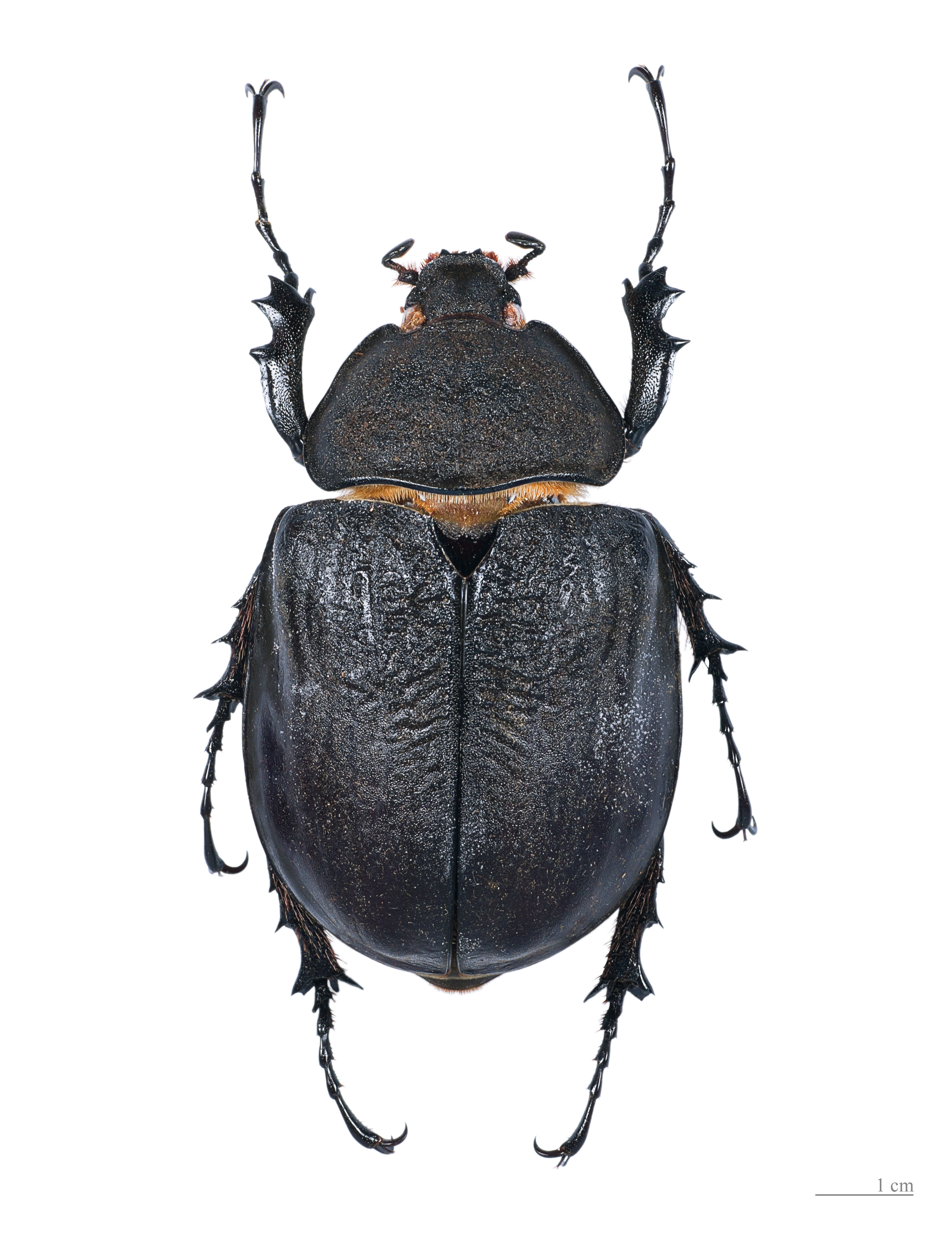
- Female of Megasoma actaeon

Scientific classification
- Kingdom: Animalia
- Phylum: Arthropoda
- Clade: Pancrustacea
- Class: Insecta
- Order: Coleoptera
- Suborder: Polyphaga
- Infraorder: Scarabaeiformia
- Family: Scarabaeidae
- Genus: Megasoma
- Species: M. actaeon

Binomial name
- Megasoma actaeon (Linnaeus, 1758)

Synonyms
- Scarabeus simson Linnaeus, 1767; Geotrupes crenatus Leach, 1817; Megasoma janus Felsche, 1906; Megasoma argentinum Höhne, 1923; Megasoma janus ramirezorum Silvestre et Arnaud, 2002; Megasoma janus fujitai Nagai, 2003; Megasoma rex Prandi, 2018 (dubious: see); Megasoma actaeon johannae Van Meenen & Schouteet, 2018

= Actaeon beetle =

Species of beetle

The Actaeon beetle (Megasoma actaeon) is a rhinoceros beetle of the family Scarabaeidae.

== Etymology ==
The species name actaeon derives from the name Actaeon of a famous Theban hero, son of the priestly herdsman Aristaeus and Autonoë in Boeotia, trained by the centaur Chiron.

== Description ==
Actaeon beetle is one of the largest of all beetles, measuring up to 7 centimetres (2.8 in) across, with a body length of about 5–12 centimetres (2.0–4.7 in). The males can grow to be 13 1/2 cm (5.3 in) long by 4 cm (1.6 in) thick .

The dorsal surfaces are glabrous (bald), matte or shiny black. The legs are powerful, with large tarsal claws. Males have appendages resembling horns on the pronotum and on the head. The two parallel horns on the pronotum are short, acute and forward pointing, while a much longer horn with a small tooth is present on the head. In the females the pronotum and the elytra are rugose and the horns are missing.

== Life cycle ==
Females lay eggs into soil at eclosion and eggs develop in about 9 months. Larval development and pupation takes in total almost 3 years. Larvae at the 3rd instar can reach the weight of 200 grams, the highest weight among insects. Life expectancy of adults in captivity reaches about 100–150 days. The heaviest actaeon larva ever recorded was found in the northern regions of South America weighed 228 grams (8.0 ounces) in 2009 nearly equivalent to a female rat. Adults are much less massive, with no confirmed specimens exceeding the record-holder among insects, the Little Barrier giant weta, Deinacrida heteracantha, documented to attain up to 71g.

== Distribution ==
This species can be found in South America, particularly in Bolivia, Brazil, Colombia, Ecuador, French Guiana, Guyana, Panama, Peru, Suriname, and Venezuela.

== See also ==
- List of largest insects
