= Astragalus magdalenae =

Scientific classification
- Kingdom: Plantae
- Clade: Tracheophytes
- Clade: Angiosperms
- Clade: Eudicots
- Clade: Rosids
- Order: Fabales
- Family: Fabaceae
- Subfamily: Faboideae
- Genus: Astragalus
- Species: A. magdalenae

Binomial name
- Astragalus magdalenae Greene

Synonyms
- Tragacantha californica Kuntze; Phaca candidissima Benth.; Astragalus crotalariae var. magdalenae (Greene) M.E.Jones

Species of flowering plant

Astragalus magdalenae is a species of flowering plant in the family Fabaceae. It is native to the territories of California and Northwest Mexico, specifically the Mexican state of Baja California Sur.

== Taxonomy ==
The species was first described by George Bentham in 1844 as Phaca candidissima, but has since been transferred to the genus Astragalus by American botanist Edward Lee Greene in 1888 under its current binomial name.

== Subtaxa ==
The following subspecies are accepted:

- Astragalus magdalenae var. magdalenae
- Astragalus magdalenae var. niveus (Rydb.) Barneby
- Astragalus magdalenae var. peirsonii (Munz & McBurney) Barneby
