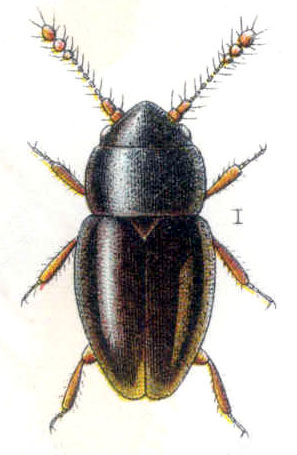
- Ptenidium pusillum from Die Käfer des Deutschen Reiches vol. 2 (1908)

Scientific classification
- Kingdom: Animalia
- Phylum: Arthropoda
- Clade: Pancrustacea
- Class: Insecta
- Order: Coleoptera
- Suborder: Polyphaga
- Infraorder: Staphyliniformia
- Family: Ptiliidae
- Subfamily: Ptiliinae; Erichson, 1845

Tribes
- Discheramocephalini; Nanosellini; Ptiliini

= Ptiliinae =

Subfamily of beetles

Ptiliinae is the largest subfamily of feather-winged beetles (family Ptilidae). About 80% of the described genera of these very tiny beetles are contained herein; however, many more genera and species await description.

Like all members of their family, they are usually found in rotting organic material in a wide range of habitats. The clutch generally contains only a single egg, which is very large in comparison to the adult female, sometimes half as long as the beetle itself.

== Selected genera ==
Tribe Discheramocephalini
- Discheramocephalus

Tribe Ptiliini

- Achosia
- Actidium
- Actinopteryx
- Africoptilium
- Astatopteryx
- Bambara
- Baeocrara
- Championella
- Cissidium
- Cnemadoxia
- Cochliarion
- Dipentium
- Etronia
- Euryptilium
- Gomyella
- Kimoda
- Kuschelidium
- Leaduadicus
- Leptinla
- Malkinella
- Micridina
- Micridium
- Microptilium
- Millidium
- Motschulskium
- Myrmicotrichis
- Nelloptodes
- Neotrichopteryx
- Nossidium
- Notoptenidium
- Oligella
- Ptenidium
- Ptenidotonium
- Pterycodes
- Pteryx
- Ptiliodes
- Ptiliola
- Ptiliolum
- Ptilium
- Ptinella
- Ptinellodes
- Rioneta
- Skidmorella

Tribe Nanosellini

- Baranowskiella
- Cylindrosella
- Cylindroselloides
- Fijiselloides
- Garicaphila
- Hydnosella
- Isolumpia
- Limulosella
- Mikado
- Nanosella
- Nellosana
- Nellosanoides
- Nepalumpia
- Paratuposa
- Phililumpia
- Porophila
- Scydosella
- Scydoselloides
- Suterina
- Tasmangarica
- Throscidium
- Throscoptilium
- Throscoptiloides
- Throscosana
- Vitusella
