= Discheramocephalus semisulcatus =

Scientific classification
- Domain: Eukaryota
- Kingdom: Animalia
- Phylum: Arthropoda
- Class: Insecta
- Order: Coleoptera
- Suborder: Polyphaga
- Infraorder: Staphyliniformia
- Family: Ptiliidae
- Genus: Discheramocephalus
- Species: D. semisulcatus

Binomial name
- Discheramocephalus semisulcatus Johnson, 2007

Species of beetle

Discheramocephalus semisulcatus is a species of feather-winged beetle, the smallest beetles on earth.
