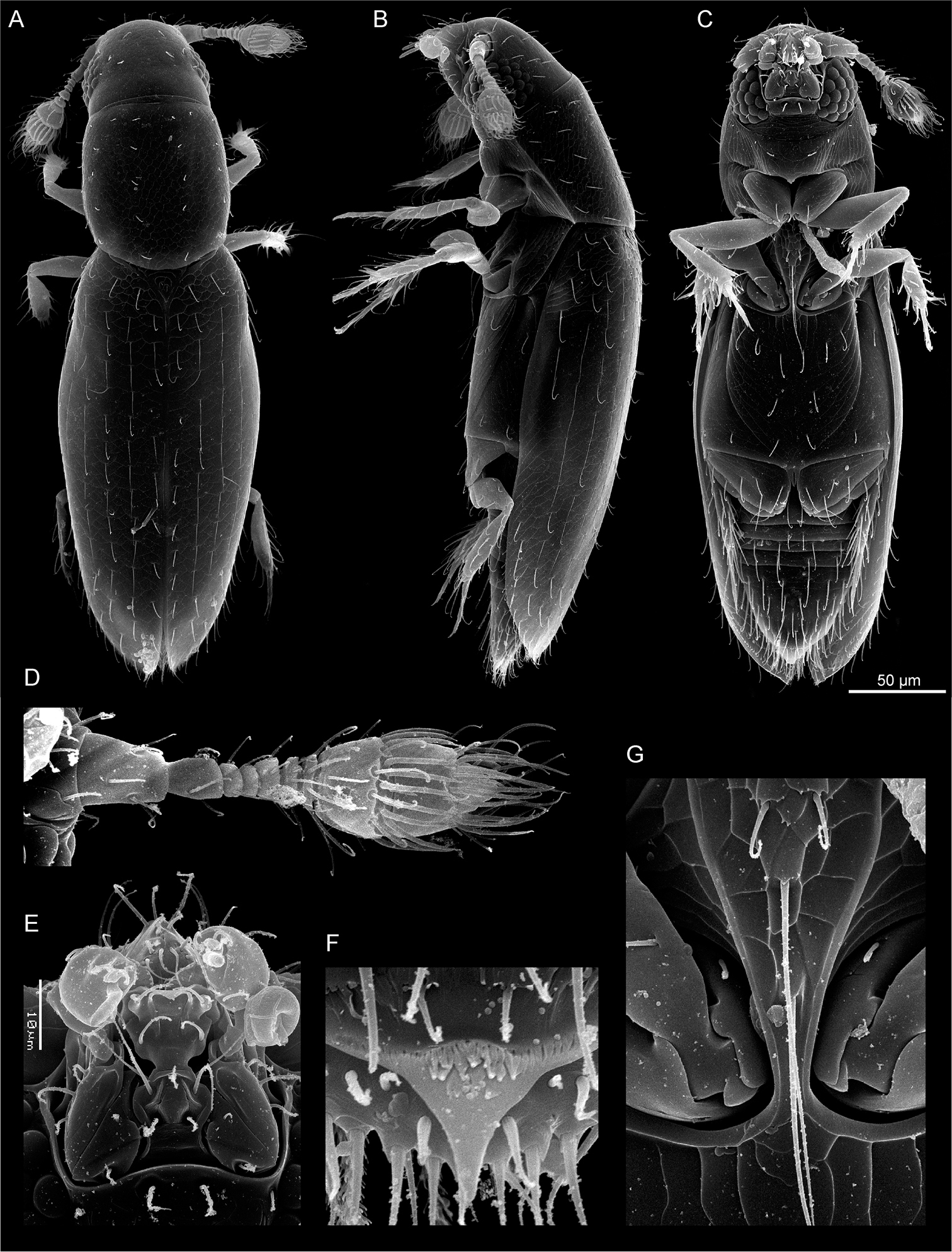
- Habitus and diagnostic characters of Scydosella musawasensis

Scientific classification
- Domain: Eukaryota
- Kingdom: Animalia
- Phylum: Arthropoda
- Class: Insecta
- Order: Coleoptera
- Suborder: Polyphaga
- Infraorder: Staphyliniformia
- Family: Ptiliidae
- Subfamily: Ptiliinae
- Tribe: Nanosellini
- Genus: Scydosella; Hall, 1999
- Species: S. musawasensis

Binomial name
- Scydosella musawasensis Hall, 1999

= Scydosella =

Genus of beetles

Scydosella is a genus of beetles that consists of only one species Scydosella musawasensis. The species is regarded as the smallest free-living insect, as well as the smallest beetle. They are among featherwing beetles, named because of their feather-like spiny wings. It was first discovered in Nicaragua, and described in 1999 by Wesley Eugene Hall of the University of Nebraska State Museum. The initial discovery consisted of very few specimens, and exact measurements were not conclusive. Because of their tiny size, they were difficult to observe under microscope after preservation. The generally accepted size was 0.300 mm in length. On 8 February 2015, Alexey Polilov of the Lomonosov Moscow State University collected 85 specimens in Chicaque National Park, Colombia. They were discovered on a layer of fungus on which they feed. From these specimens exact measurements could be made, and was found that the smallest individual is only 0.325 mm long. The largest individual is 0.352 mm long, and the average length of all the specimens is 0.338 mm. The body is elongated and oval in shape, yellowish-brown in colour, and its antennae are split into 10 segments.

== See also ==
- Smallest organisms
