= Discheramocephalus minutissimus =

Scientific classification
- Domain: Eukaryota
- Kingdom: Animalia
- Phylum: Arthropoda
- Class: Insecta
- Order: Coleoptera
- Suborder: Polyphaga
- Infraorder: Staphyliniformia
- Family: Ptiliidae
- Genus: Discheramocephalus
- Species: D. minutissimus

Binomial name
- Discheramocephalus minutissimus Grebennikov, 2007

Species of beetle

Discheramocephalus minutissimus is a species of feather-winged beetle, the smallest beetles on earth, first found in Indonesia. This species' adults have a body length of approximately 400 to 426μm. According to Grebennikov, the main factor limiting miniaturisation of female insects is an egg size significant enough in size to produce viable larvae. This size threshold is sometimes overcome, reaching limits of 180 and 130 μm in females and males, respectively, according to the author. Brain size is possibly the second most important factor limiting miniaturisation in this class.
