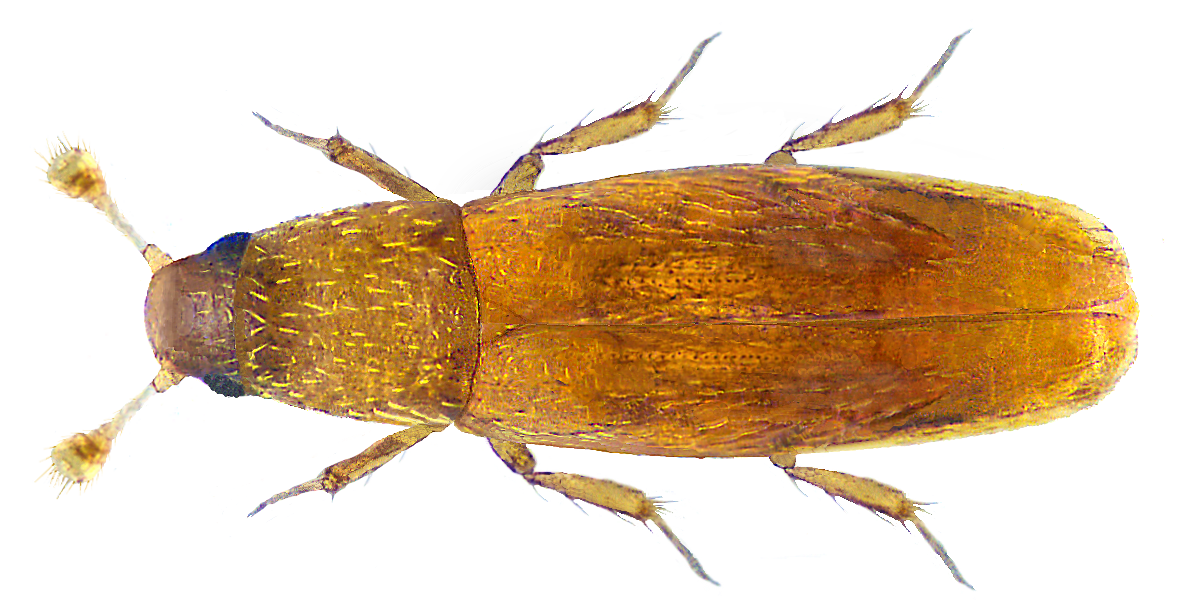

Scientific classification
- Domain: Eukaryota
- Kingdom: Animalia
- Phylum: Arthropoda
- Class: Insecta
- Order: Coleoptera
- Suborder: Polyphaga
- Infraorder: Staphyliniformia
- Family: Ptiliidae
- Genus: Baranowskiella
- Species: B. ehnstromi

Binomial name
- Baranowskiella ehnstromi Sörensson, 1997

= Baranowskiella ehnstromi =

Species of beetle

Baranowskiella ehnstromi is the smallest known beetle in Europe. It lives only in the pores of the bracket fungus Phellinus conchatus, which grows on Salix caprea, and Phellinus punctatus, which grows on various deciduous trees. Its length is ca. 0.45–0.55 millimetres (0.018–0.022 in) and its width about 0.1 millimetres (0.0039 in).

The beetle has been observed in Sweden, Finland, Austria, Norway, and the Czech Republic. It was first described, along with the whole genus Baranowskiella, in 1997 by Ptiliidae specialist Mikael Sörensson and named after entomologists Rickard Baranowski and Bengt Ehnström. The beetle has a simple sound producing organ. It can fly and its diet consists of fungi spores.
