= Discheramocephalus mikaeli =

Scientific classification
- Kingdom: Animalia
- Phylum: Arthropoda
- Class: Insecta
- Order: Coleoptera
- Suborder: Polyphaga
- Infraorder: Staphyliniformia
- Family: Ptiliidae
- Genus: Discheramocephalus
- Species: D. mikaeli

Binomial name
- Discheramocephalus mikaeli Grebennikov, 2007

Species of beetle

Discheramocephalus mikaeli is a species of feather-winged beetle, the smallest beetles on earth, first found in Tanzania.
