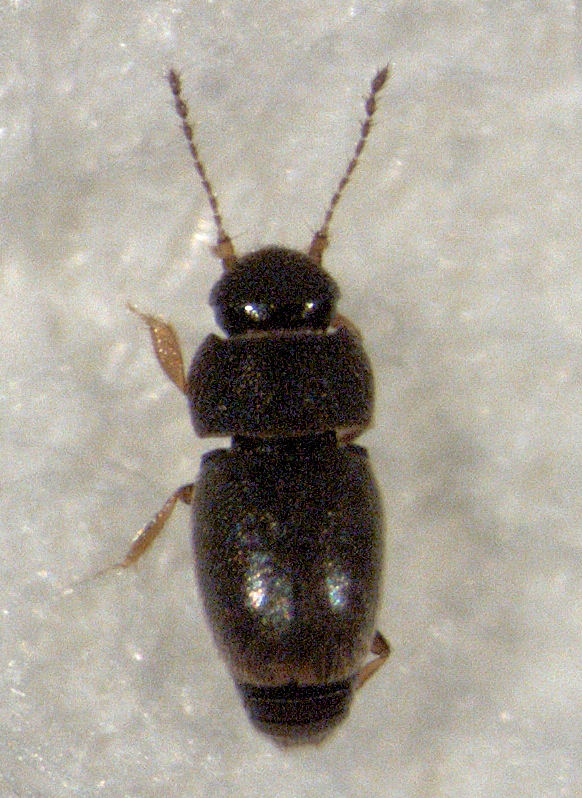
- Ptiliodes austerus male

Scientific classification
- Kingdom: Animalia
- Phylum: Arthropoda
- Class: Insecta
- Order: Coleoptera
- Suborder: Polyphaga
- Infraorder: Staphyliniformia
- Family: Ptiliidae
- Subfamily: Ptiliinae
- Tribe: Ptiliini
- Genus: Ptiliodes; Matthews, 1882

= Ptiliodes =

Genus of beetles

Ptiliodes is a genus of featherwing beetles in the beetle subfamily Ptiliinae tribe Ptiliini.
