= Discheramocephalus =

Scientific classification
- Domain: Eukaryota
- Kingdom: Animalia
- Phylum: Arthropoda
- Class: Insecta
- Order: Coleoptera
- Suborder: Polyphaga
- Infraorder: Staphyliniformia
- Family: Ptiliidae
- Subfamily: Ptiliinae
- Tribe: Discheramocephalini
- Genus: Discheramocephalus; Johnson, 2007

Type species
- Discheramocephalus semisulcatus Johnson, 2007

Species
- See text

Genus of beetles

Discheramocephalus is a genus of feather-winged beetles, the smallest beetles on earth, first found in Cameroon. It was originally described in 2007 as a monotypic genus (only a single known species). Six additional species were added in 2008, and two were added in 2013.

== Species ==
- Discheramocephalus bisulcatus Darby, 2013
- Discheramocephalus brucei Grebennikov, 2008
- Discheramocephalus elisabethae Grebennikov, 2008
- Discheramocephalus jarmilae Grebennikov, 2008
- Discheramocephalus mikaeli Grebennikov, 2008
- Discheramocephalus minutissimus Grebennikov, 2008
- Discheramocephalus semisulcatus Johnson, 2007
- Discheramocephalus stewarti Grebennikov, 2008
- Discheramocephalus vasilii Darby, 2013
