= Pteryx (disambiguation) =

Pteryx is a genus of beetles.

Pteryx may also refer to:

- Pteryx UAV, robotic airplane
- "-pteryx", a suffix used in taxonomy
- Pteryx suturalis, species of insect
