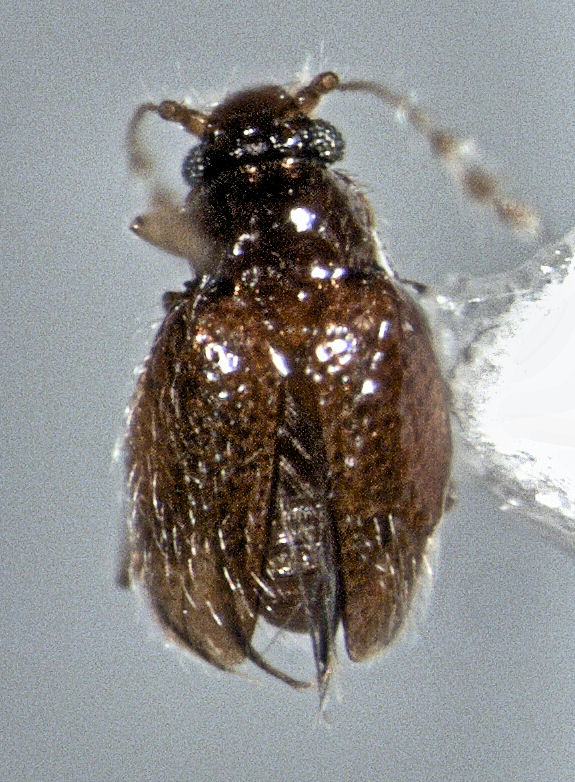
- Cissidium foveolatum

Scientific classification
- Kingdom: Animalia
- Phylum: Arthropoda
- Class: Insecta
- Order: Coleoptera
- Suborder: Polyphaga
- Infraorder: Staphyliniformia
- Family: Ptiliidae
- Subfamily: Ptiliinae
- Tribe: Discheramocephalini; Grebennikov, 2009

Genera
- Africoptilium; Cissidium; Dacrysoma; Discheramocephalus; Fenestellidium; †Kekveus; Skidmorella

= Discheramocephalini =

Tribe of beetles

Discheramocephalini is a tribe of feather-winged beetles first proposed in 2009. It contains six extant genera, and one extinct genus.
