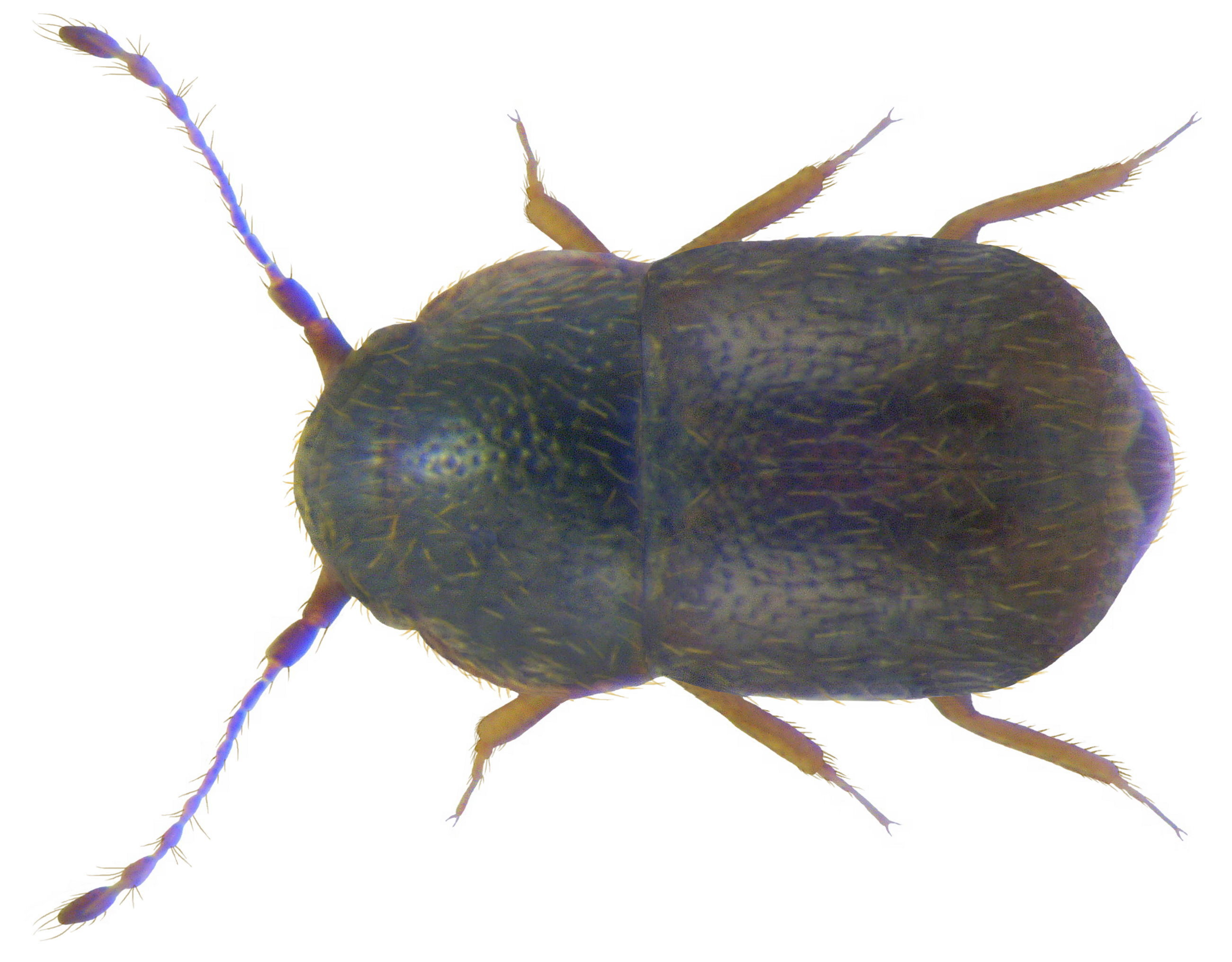
- Baeocrara variolosa

Scientific classification
- Domain: Eukaryota
- Kingdom: Animalia
- Phylum: Arthropoda
- Class: Insecta
- Order: Coleoptera
- Suborder: Polyphaga
- Infraorder: Staphyliniformia
- Family: Ptiliidae
- Genus: Baeocrara; Thomson, 1859

= Baeocrara =

Genus of beetles

Baeocrara is a genus of featherwing beetles named because of the intricate structure of their flight wings, which have a long fringe of hairs on their borders. They belong to the Ptiliidae family, and are minute: between 1 and 0.5 mm. They are mostly found in hollow fir stumps and other types of rotten wood, dung and plant detritus. They feed on fungal spores. They seem to be recent immigrants to Northern Europe possibly introduced by the import of sawmill products. They have been reported in the Czech Republic. They are one of the least known groups in the Coleoptera.

== Species ==
These eight species belong to the genus Baeocrara:

- Baeocrara andrewesi Johnson, 1986
- Baeocrara japonica (Matthews, 1884)
- Baeocrara minima Darby, 2019
- Baeocrara parvula Johnson, 1986
- Baeocrara silbermanni (Wencker, 1866)
- Baeocrara tshiaberimuensis Johnson, 1986
- Baeocrara vaga Johnson, 1986
- Baeocrara variolosa (Mulsant & Rey, 1861)
