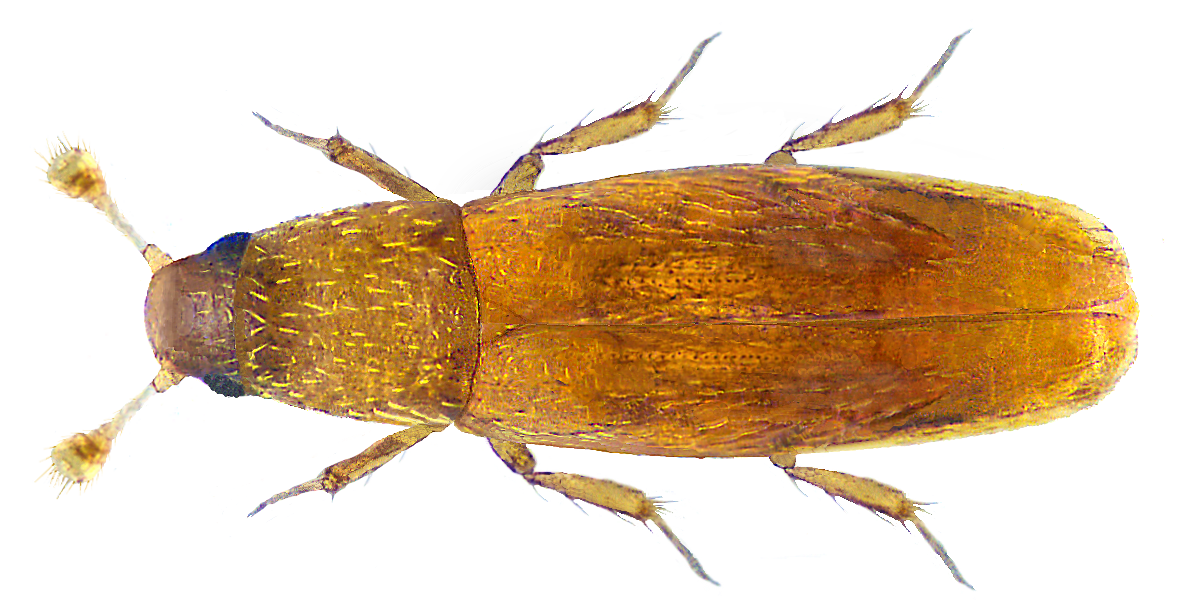
- Baranowskiella ehnstromi

Scientific classification
- Domain: Eukaryota
- Kingdom: Animalia
- Phylum: Arthropoda
- Class: Insecta
- Order: Coleoptera
- Suborder: Polyphaga
- Infraorder: Staphyliniformia
- Family: Ptiliidae
- Genus: Baranowskiella; Sörensson, 1997

Species
- B. ehnstromi

= Baranowskiella =

Genus of beetles

Baranowskiella is a genus of beetles in the Ptiliidae family.
