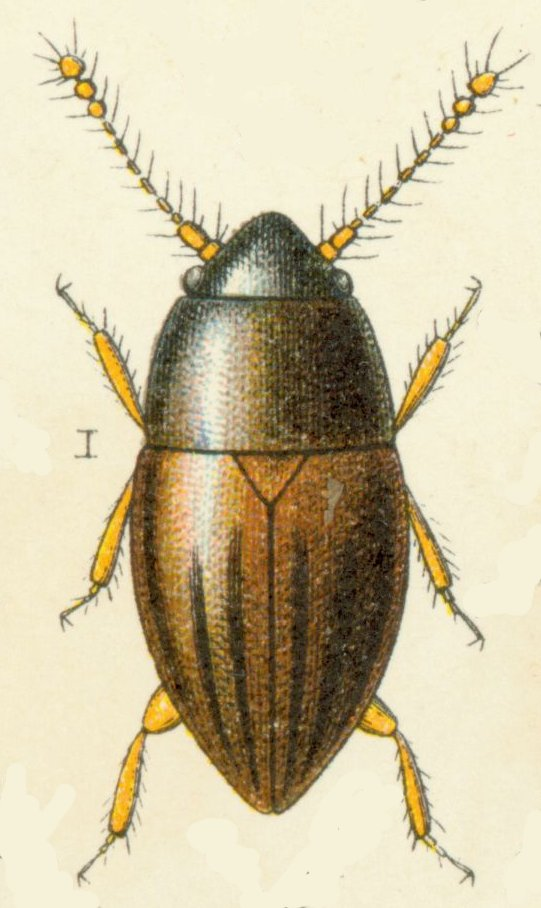

Scientific classification
- Kingdom: Animalia
- Phylum: Arthropoda
- Class: Insecta
- Order: Coleoptera
- Suborder: Polyphaga
- Infraorder: Staphyliniformia
- Family: Ptiliidae
- Genus: Ptenidium; Erichson, 1845

= Ptenidium =

Genus of beetles

Ptenidium is a genus of beetles belonging to the family Ptiliidae.

The genus has cosmopolitan distribution.

Species:

- Ptenidium aprinum Peyerimhoff, 1917
- Ptenidium azafady Darby, 2014
