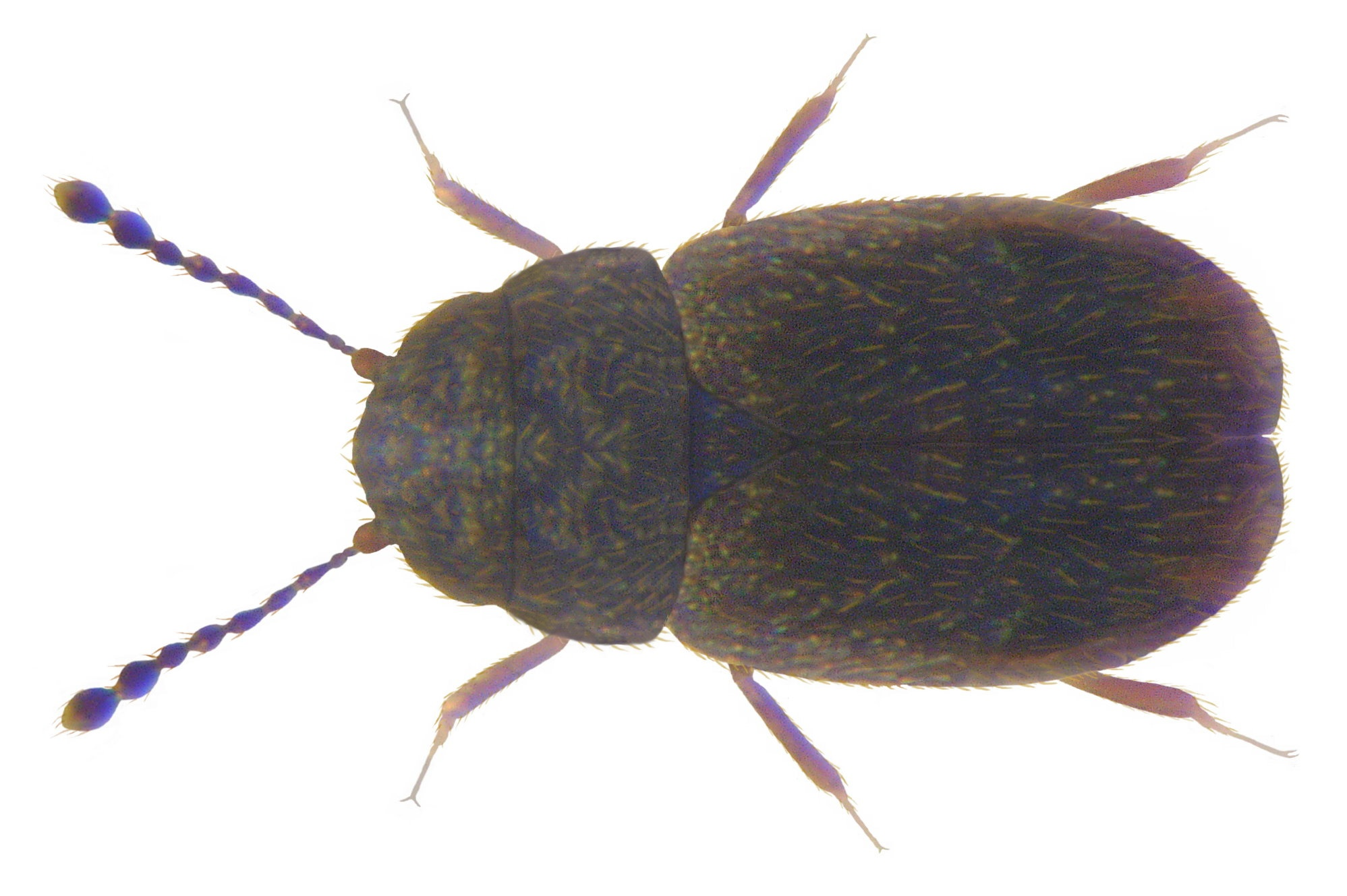

Scientific classification
- Kingdom: Animalia
- Phylum: Arthropoda
- Class: Insecta
- Order: Coleoptera
- Suborder: Polyphaga
- Infraorder: Staphyliniformia
- Family: Ptiliidae
- Genus: Ptiliola; Haldeman, 1848

= Ptiliola =

Genus of beetles

Ptiliola is a genus of beetles belonging to the family Ptiliidae.

The species of this genus are found in Europe and Northern America.

Species:

- Ptiliola brevicollis (Matthews, 1860)
- Ptiliola collani (Mäklin, 1853)
