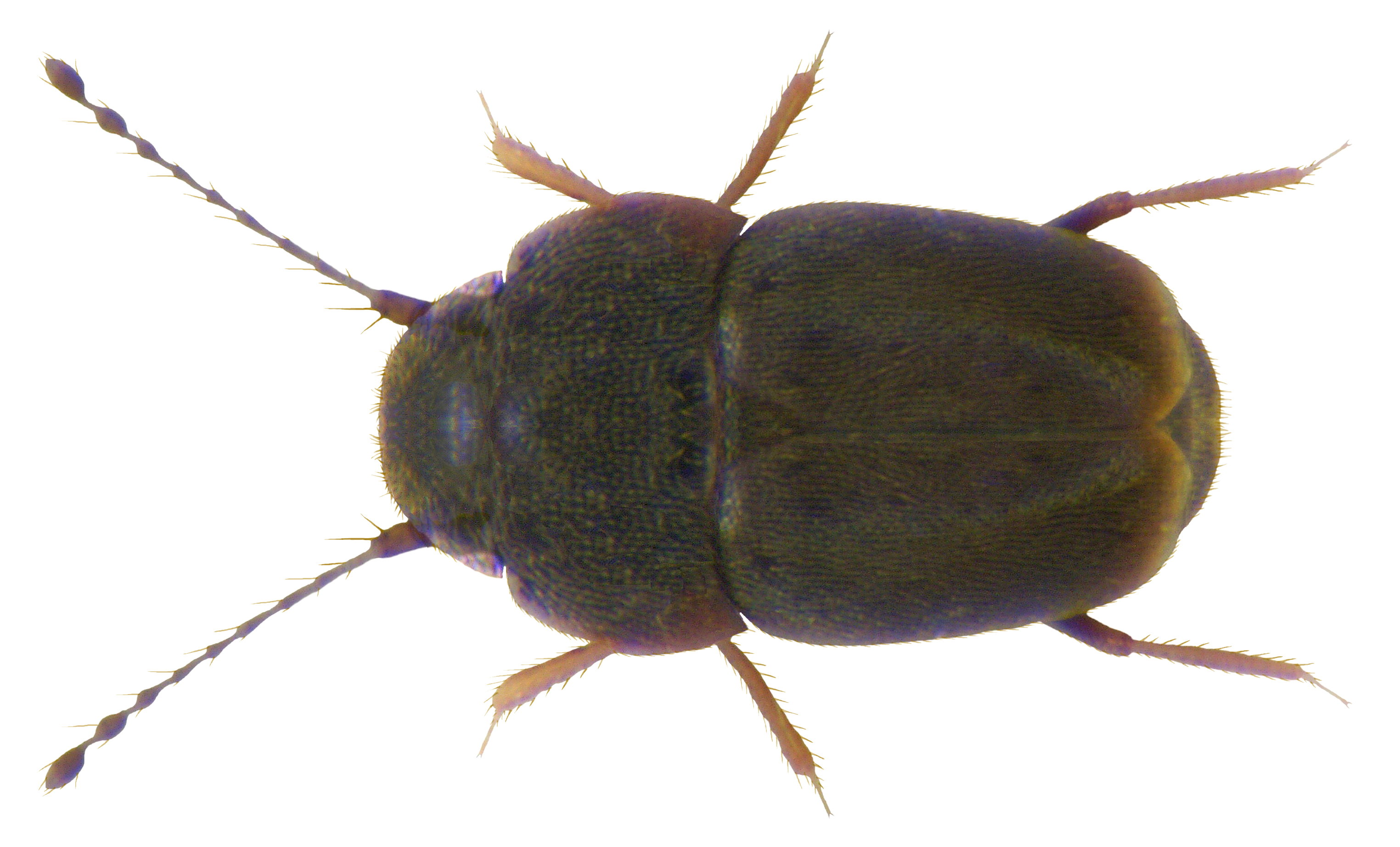
- Actinopteryx fucicola

Scientific classification
- Domain: Eukaryota
- Kingdom: Animalia
- Phylum: Arthropoda
- Class: Insecta
- Order: Coleoptera
- Suborder: Polyphaga
- Infraorder: Staphyliniformia
- Family: Ptiliidae
- Genus: Actinopteryx; Matthews, 1872

Species
- Actinopteryx fucicola; Actinopteryx hercules; Actinopteryx hoguei; Actinopteryx lancifer; Actinopteryx parallela; Actinopteryx reflexa; Actinopteryx tillyardi

= Actinopteryx =

Genus of beetles

Actinopteryx is a genus of beetles belonging to the family Ptiliidae which is sometimes referred to as feather-winged beetles as the hindwings are narrow and feather-like.
