= Microptilium =

Scientific classification
- Domain: Eukaryota
- Kingdom: Animalia
- Phylum: Arthropoda
- Class: Insecta
- Order: Coleoptera
- Suborder: Polyphaga
- Infraorder: Staphyliniformia
- Family: Ptiliidae
- Genus: Microptilium; Matthews, 1872

Genus of beetles

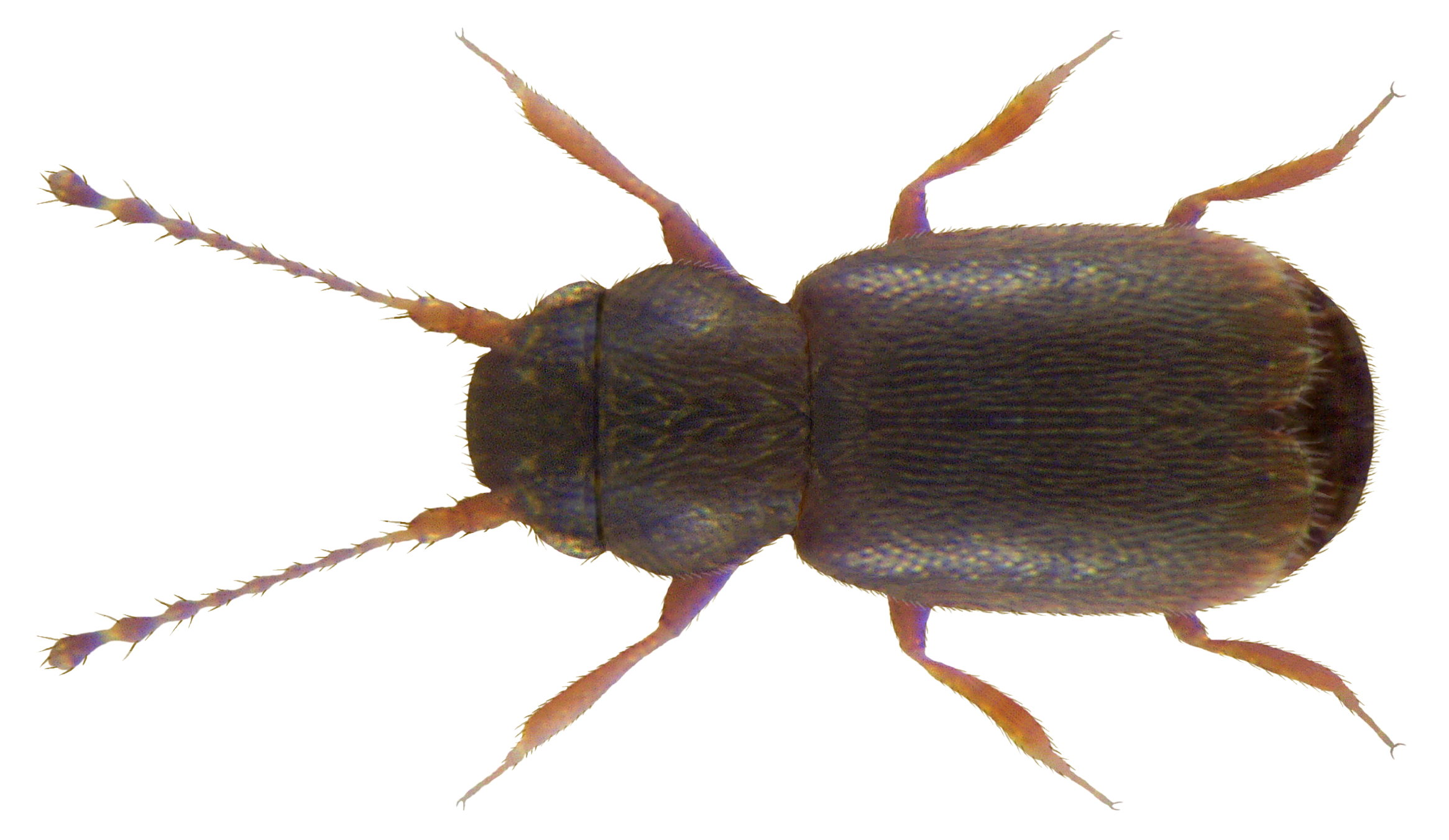

Microptilium is a genus of beetles belonging to the family Ptiliidae.

The species of this genus are found in Europe.

Species:

- Microptilium geistautsi Dybas, 1961
- Microptilium palustre Kuntzen, 1914
