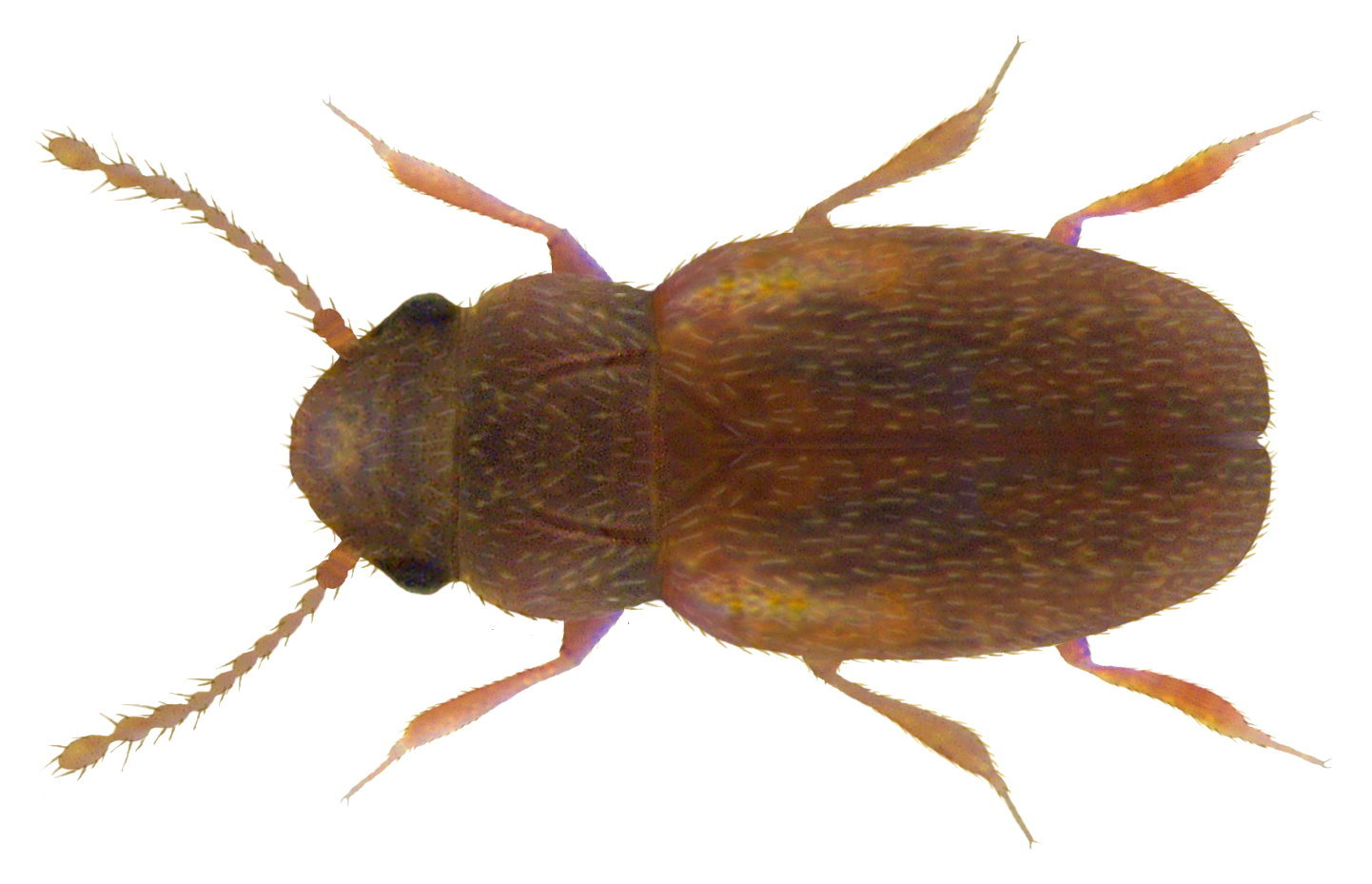
- Micridium halidaii

Scientific classification
- Domain: Eukaryota
- Kingdom: Animalia
- Phylum: Arthropoda
- Class: Insecta
- Order: Coleoptera
- Suborder: Polyphaga
- Infraorder: Staphyliniformia
- Family: Ptiliidae
- Genus: Micridium; Motschulsky, 1869

= Micridium =

Genus of insects

Micridium is a genus of beetles belonging to the family Ptiliidae.

The species of this genus are found in Europe and America.

Species:

- Micridium angulicolle (Fairmaire, 1858)
- Micridium attenboroughi Darby, 2017
