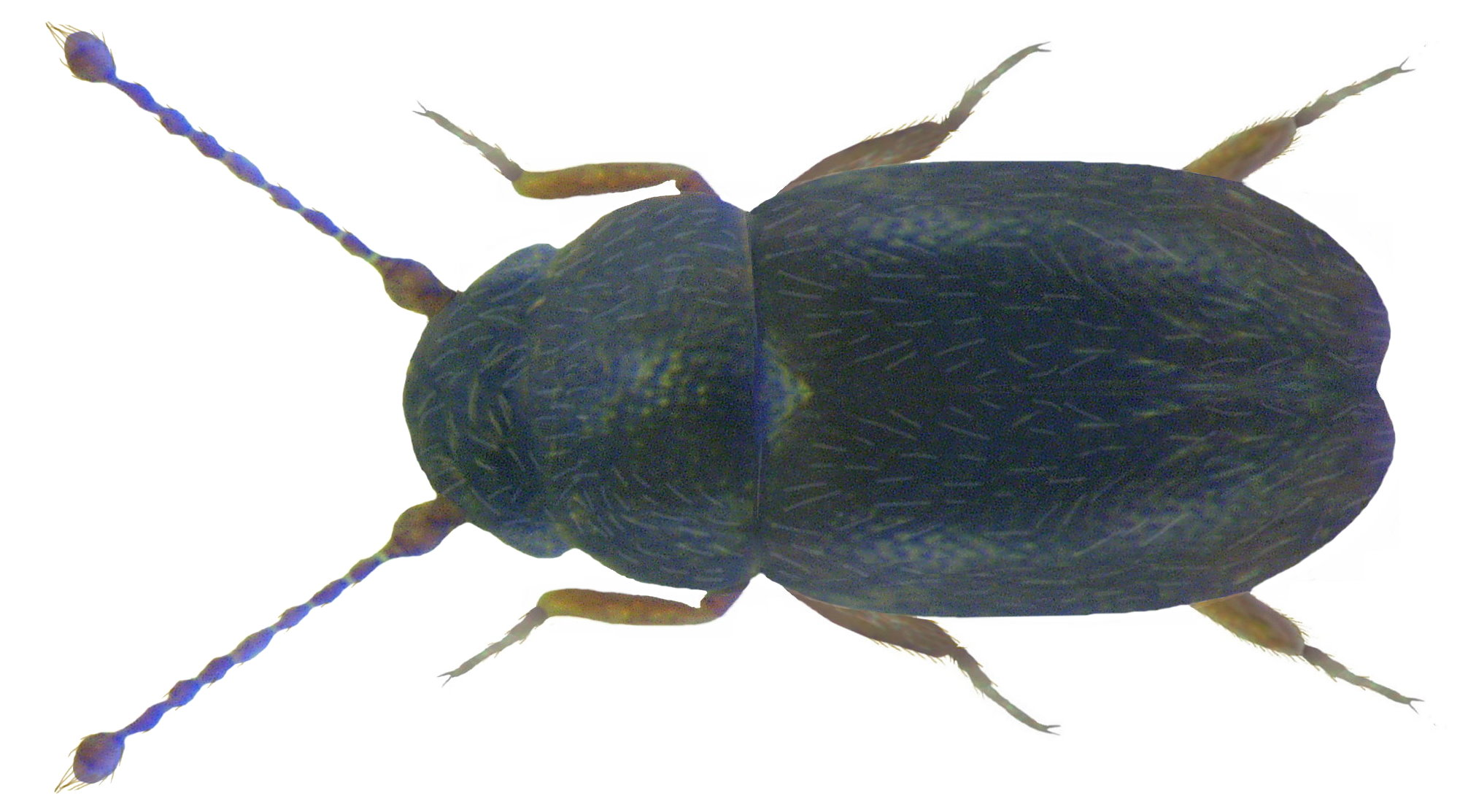
- Ptiliolum fuscum

Scientific classification
- Domain: Eukaryota
- Kingdom: Animalia
- Phylum: Arthropoda
- Class: Insecta
- Order: Coleoptera
- Suborder: Polyphaga
- Infraorder: Staphyliniformia
- Family: Ptiliidae
- Genus: Ptiliolum; Flach, 1888

= Ptiliolum =

Genus of beetles

Ptiliolum is a genus of beetles belonging to the family Ptiliidae.

The species of this genus are found in Europe and Northern America.

Species:

- Ptiliolum africanum Peyerimhoff, 1917
- Ptiliolum atlanticum Peyerimhoff, 1917
