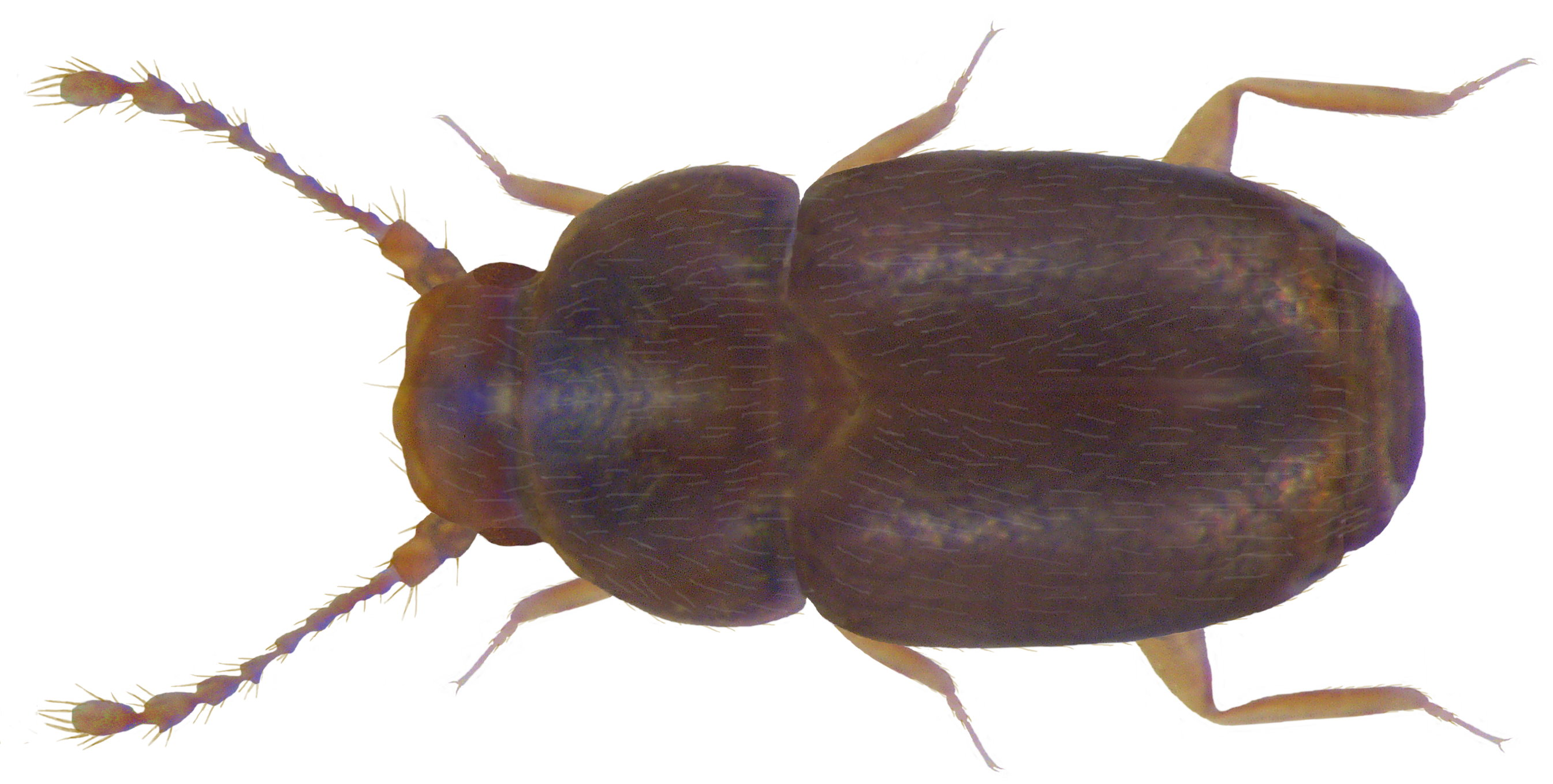
- Pteryx suturalis

Scientific classification
- Kingdom: Animalia
- Phylum: Arthropoda
- Class: Insecta
- Order: Coleoptera
- Suborder: Polyphaga
- Infraorder: Staphyliniformia
- Family: Ptiliidae
- Subfamily: Ptiliinae
- Tribe: Ptiliini
- Genus: Pteryx; Matthews, 1858

Species
- Pteryx franzi; Pteryx splendens; Pteryx suturalis

= Pteryx =

Genus of beetles

Pteryx is a genus of beetles that is typically found in northern bogs in the Northern Hemisphere. They belong to the family Ptiliidae which is referred to as feather-winged beetles as the hindwings are narrow and feather-like. Like most of the rest of the family, Pteryx are very small and live in rotting vegetative matter. They prefer rotting wood and are generally found under the bark of rotting logs or stumps.

== Description ==
The Pteryx are less than 1 mm in length. They are polymorphic, in that they frequently occur in two forms, a normal variety, and a neonate form that has only vestigial wings, pale body pigmentation, and no pigmentation in their smaller eyes.

== Distribution ==
Pteryx are found in Eurasia and as far south as the Canary Islands. Pteryx are found in North America from Canada, to as far south as Georgia. Although not restricted to bogs and swamps, they are found more abundantly in those locales.
