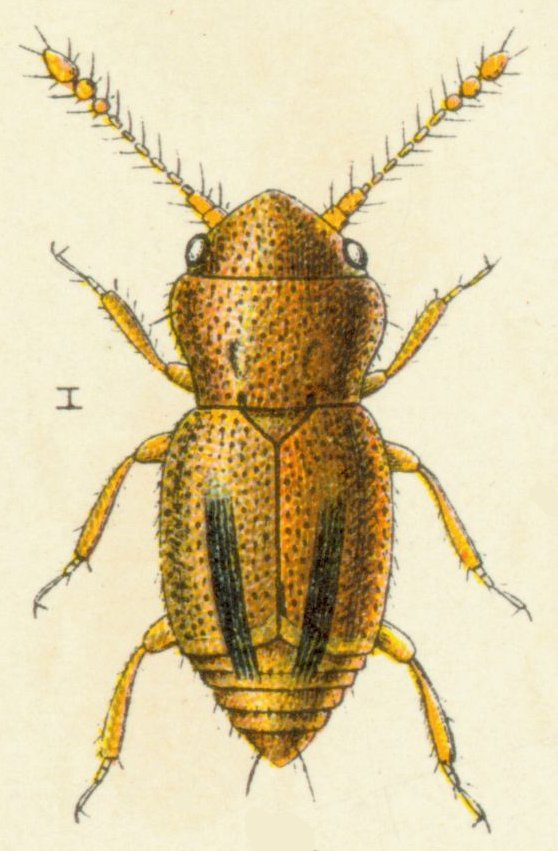
- Ptinella limbata

Scientific classification
- Kingdom: Animalia
- Phylum: Arthropoda
- Class: Insecta
- Order: Coleoptera
- Suborder: Polyphaga
- Infraorder: Staphyliniformia
- Family: Ptiliidae
- Genus: Ptinella; Motschulsky, 1844

= Ptinella =

Genus of beetles

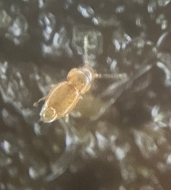
A live image of a Ptinella beetle

Ptinella is a genus of beetles belonging to the family Ptiliidae.

The genus has almost cosmopolitan distribution.

Species:

- Ptinella acaciae Johnson, 1982
- Ptinella africana Paulian & Delamare-Deboutteville, 1948
