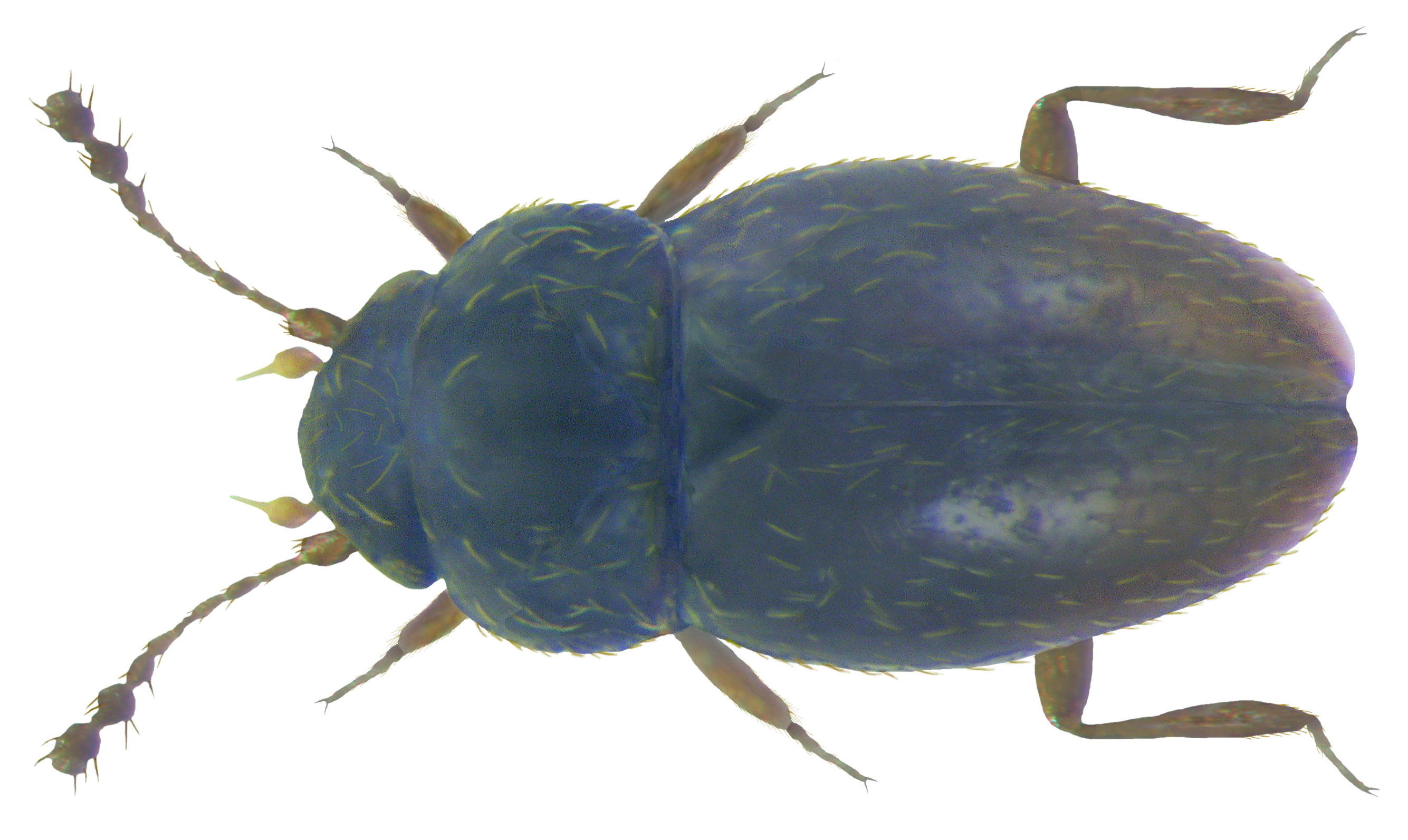
- Ptenidium pusillum

Scientific classification
- Kingdom: Animalia
- Phylum: Arthropoda
- Clade: Pancrustacea
- Class: Insecta
- Order: Coleoptera
- Suborder: Polyphaga
- Infraorder: Staphyliniformia
- Superfamily: Staphylinoidea
- Family: Ptiliidae; Erichson, 1845

Subfamilies
- Acrotrichinae; Cephaloplectinae; Ptiliinae

Synonyms
- Trichopterygidae Erichson, 1845

= Ptiliidae =

Ptiliidae Temporal range: Barremian–Recent

Family of beetles

Ptiliidae (Ptenidium pusillum) is a family of very tiny beetles (including the smallest of all beetles) with a cosmopolitan distribution. They are colloquially called featherwing beetles, because the hindwings are narrow and feathery.

There are approximately 600 described species in 80 genera, but large numbers of specimens in collections await description and the true number of species is likely to be much higher than this.

The family is divided into 3 subfamilies:

- Acrotrichinae
- Cephaloplectinae
- Ptiliinae

== Description ==
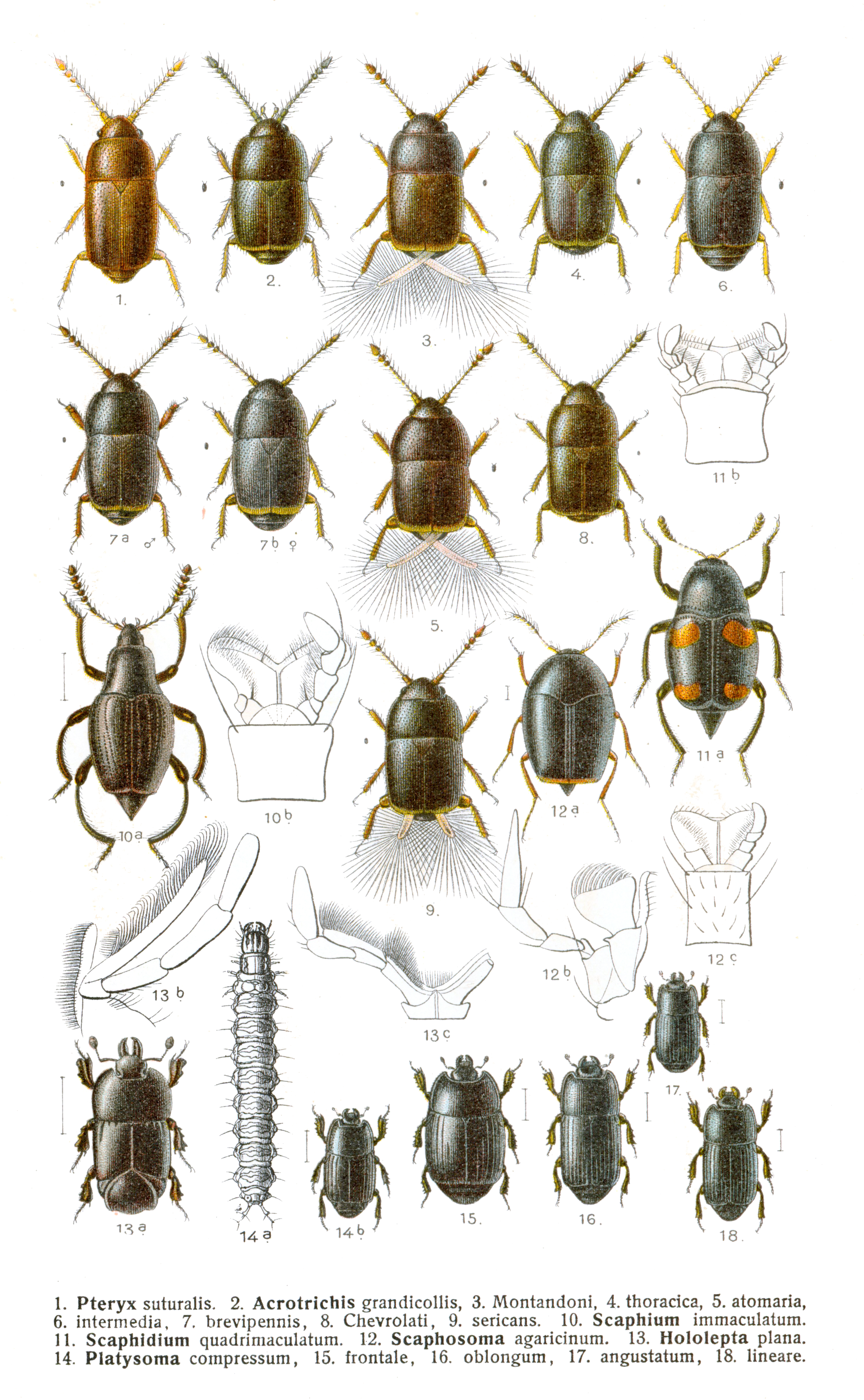
Ptiliidae figures 1-9 note the feathered wings

This family contains the smallest of all beetles, with a length when fully grown of 0.3–4.0 millimetres (0.01–0.16 in). The weight is approximately 0.4 milligrams. Ptillid wings are feathery due to the much higher effective viscosity of air at small body sizes, which makes normal insect wings much less efficient. Unlike other small insects with feathery wings, such as parasitic wasps like fairyflies, ptillids do not fly using a clap and fling motion, but instead fly using a figure of eight pattern where the wings clap at the apex of the upward and downward strokes. They are capable of flying at speeds comparable to their larger relatives.

The small size has forced many species to sacrifice some of their anatomy, like the heart, crop, and gizzard. While the exoskeleton and respiration system of the insects seems to be the major limiting factors regarding how large they can get, the limit for how small they can become appears to be related to the space required for their nervous and reproductive systems.

Many species (e.g. in Ptinella, Pteryx, and Ptinellodes) are polymorphic, with two morphs so distinct that they appear to be different species or genera. There is a normal morph with well-developed eyes, wings and pigmentation, and also a vestigial morph in which these features are reduced or lacking. The vestigial morph is more common, making up 90% or more of individuals.

== Life cycle and reproduction ==
The featherwing beetles are holometabolous organism. They reproduce sexually & likely will mate in microhabitats. The family opportunistically mates, so the courtship behavior isn't high. Ptiliidae have three larval instars & a short life cycle with an egg-adult time of 32–45 days observed for three British species of Ptinella. The adults usually live weeks up to a few months. They can reproduce continuously under favourable conditions, with larvae often co-occurring with both teneral and fully hardened adults at different times of the year. Due to how large the eggs are, only one egg receives nourishment and matures in the abdomen, the egg itself is about half the size of the female. Some featherwing beetles have also recorded a high occurrence of Thelytokous parthenogenesis. A few species have populations that are female-only. Five of seven species of the genus Bambara are known specifically for being female-only.

== Wing morphology ==
Ptiliidae have functional constraints that come with their generally small size, specifically for wings. Miniaturization leads to changes in wing structure & the number of veins.

In the featherwing beetles, there's a presence of dysmorphia in the number of veins in the wings based on size; larger individuals have at least 5 veins present meanwhile the smaller featherwings have 3 or less. There's a reduction in the venation as the size of the Pitiliidae decreases. As the body size decreases more, wings show adaptations to allow for more efficient & effective flying; regardless of their small size and moderate-high winds.

The number of marginal setae (mini-feathers) on the wings differs amongst large and tiny ptiliids. Bigger featherwings have around 200-300 setae and smaller ones have about 40 of them. For bigger featherwings, the wings are more solid during flight which allow for stronger lift & better flight control. However, they're heavier and require more energy for flight. On the other hand, smaller beetles have lighter & more porous wings that require less energy to use and is perfectly suited for their body. Although, these wings give the ptiliid less control during flight and a weaker lift.

== Ecology ==
Adults and larvae are microphagous, feeding on the spores and hyphae of fungi, as well as other organic detritus. They are found in a wide variety of habitats, including rotting and fungus infested wood, tree holes, under kelp along shorelines and within or near ant and termite nests.

== Evolution ==
Fossil ptiliids have been recorded from the Oligocene, roughly 30 million years ago from the Eocene, 46.2–43.5 million years ago, and from the Cretaceous Lebanese and Burmese amber, dated to 125 and 99 million years ago, respectively.
