= Polyphemus (disambiguation) =

Polyphemus is a Cyclops in Greek mythology.

Polyphemus may also refer to:

== Animals ==
- Antheraea polyphemus, or Polyphemus moth, a giant silk moth of North America
- Polyphemus (crustacean), a genus of cladocerans
- Limulus polyphemus, the Atlantic horseshoe crab
- Mecynorhina polyphemus, a species of beetle

== Art and entertainment ==
- Polyphemus (book), a collection of short stories by Michael Shea
- Polyphemus (Reni), a 1639–1640 painting by Guido Reni
- Polyphemus (sculpture), an 1888 bronze by Auguste Rodin
- Polifemo (1735), an Italian opera by Nicola Porpora
- Polyphème (1922), a French opera by Jean Cras based on a 1902 verse play by Albert Samain
- The name of the gas giant in the Avatar series, which Pandora orbits

== Other uses ==
- Polyphemus (Argonaut), another figure from Greek mythology
- HMS Polyphemus, the name of several ships of the British Royal Navy

== See also ==
- Polifemo, a 1627 poem by Luis de Góngora y Argote
- Polyphem (missile), a cancelled surface-to-surface missile project
- Polyphemus#Possible origins, for folktales similar to that of Homer's Polyphemus
