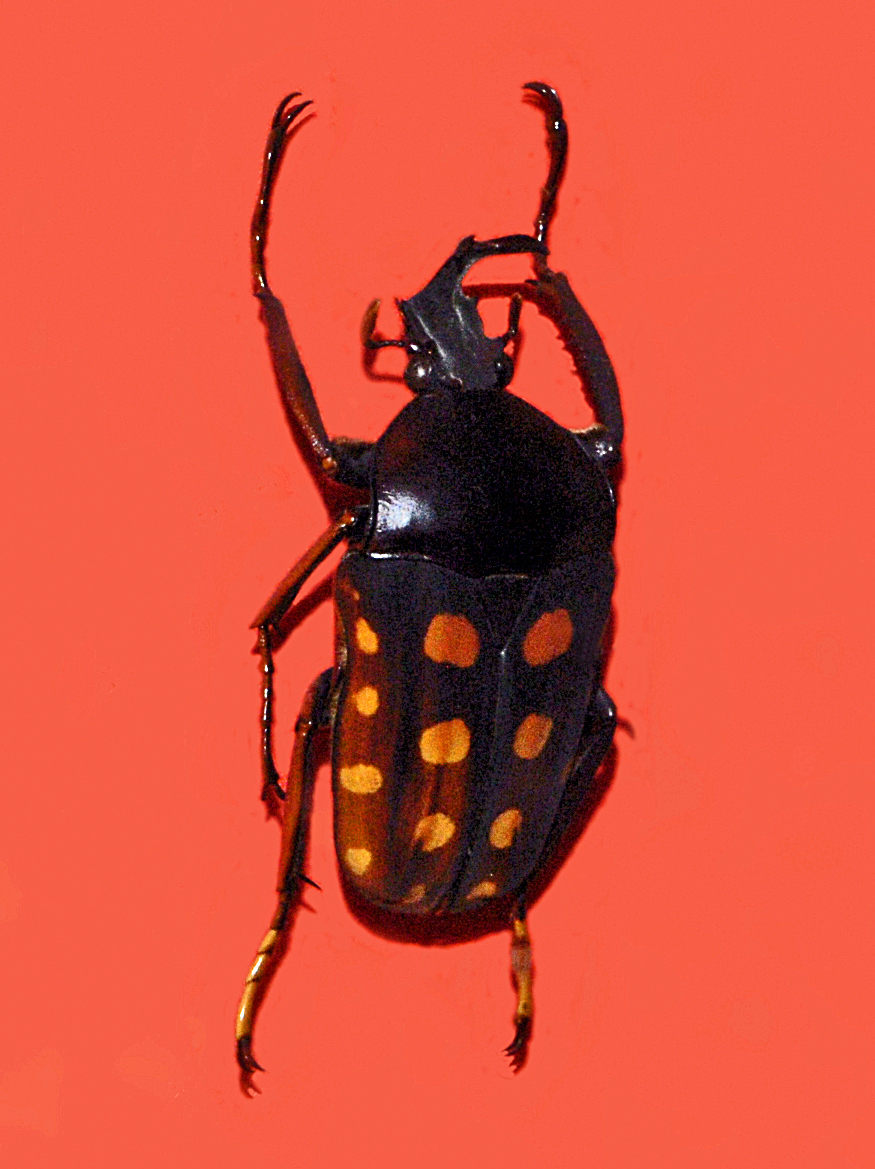
- Mounted specimen of Mecynorhina passerinii, male

Scientific classification
- Kingdom: Animalia
- Phylum: Arthropoda
- Clade: Pancrustacea
- Class: Insecta
- Order: Coleoptera
- Suborder: Polyphaga
- Infraorder: Scarabaeiformia
- Family: Scarabaeidae
- Genus: Mecynorhina
- Species: M. passerinii

Binomial name
- Mecynorhina passerinii (Westwood, 1844)

Synonyms
- Amaurodes passerinii Westwood, 1844; Amanthodes passerini; Amantodes passerini Westwood, 1854; Callopistes passerini (Westwood) Schaum, 1844; Ceratorhina passerini (misspelling); Ceratorrhina passerini (Westwood) Bertoloni, 1889

= Mecynorhina passerinii =

Species of beetle

Mecynorhina passerinii, the orange-spotted fruit chafer, is a species of beetles belonging to the family Scarabaeidae, subfamily Cetoniinae.

== Subspecies ==
- Mecynorhina passerinii dukei (Allard, 1985)
- Mecynorhina passerinii nigricans (Fairmaire, 1897)
- Mecynorhina passerinii passerinii (Westwood, 1844)

== Description ==
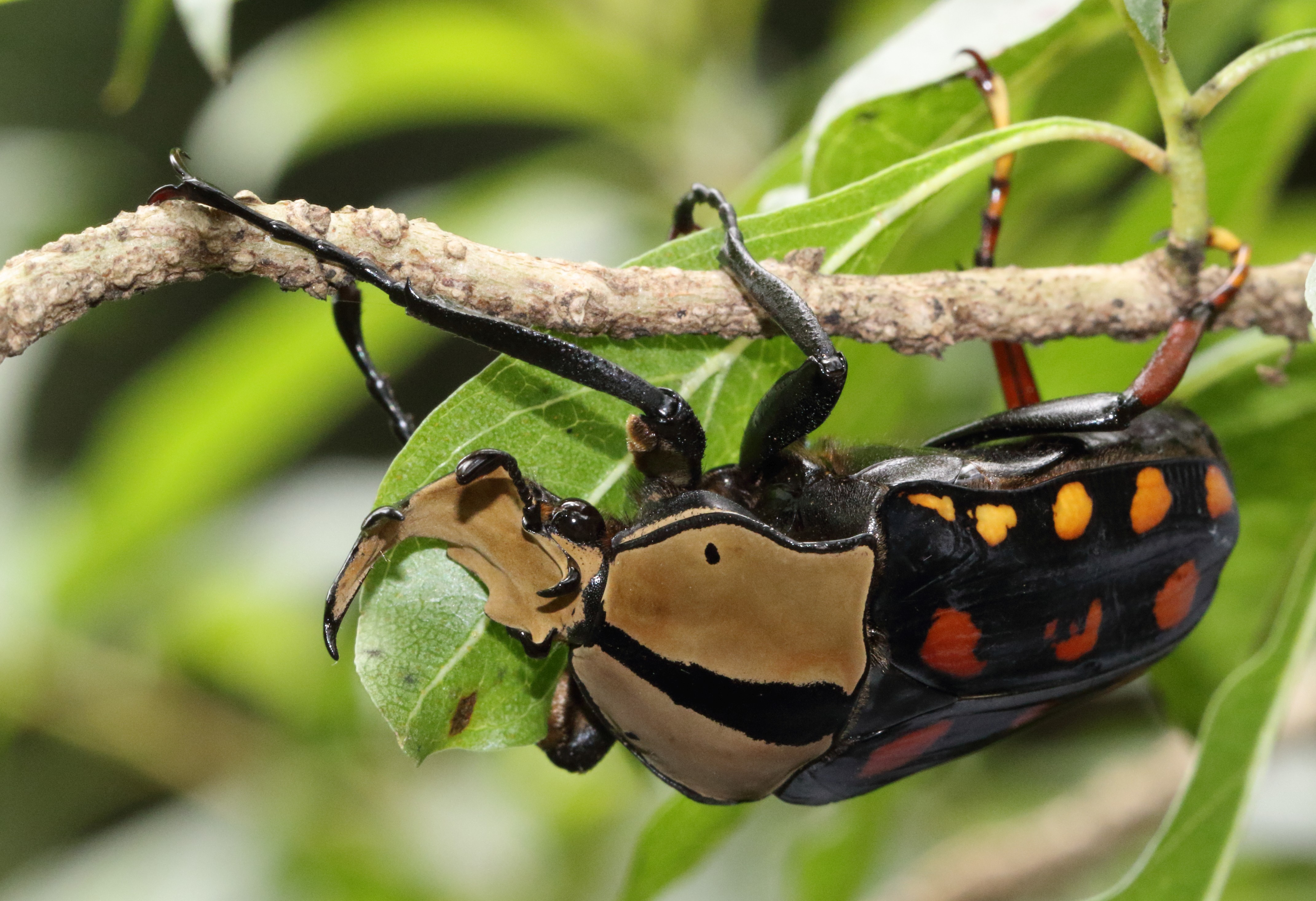
Male in Pietermaritzburg.

Mecynorhina passerinii can reach a length of about 30–45 millimetres (1.2–1.8 in) in males, of about 40–55 millimetres (1.6–2.2 in) in females. Males show large forward-projecting horns. Elytra are black or dark brown with orange spots. The coloration of the thoracic shield (pronotum) may be yellowish, brown or black, usually with a broad brown or black central stripe. Hind tibiae and tarsi are orange-brown. These beetles feed on sap of the Bridelia micrantha.

== Distribution ==
This species can be found in South Africa, Eswatini, Mozambique, Zimbabwe, Zambia, Democratic Republic of the Congo and Tanzania.
