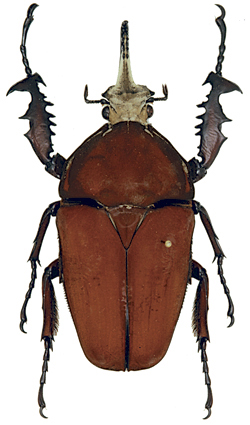
- Mecynorhina ugandensis

Scientific classification
- Kingdom: Animalia
- Phylum: Arthropoda
- Class: Insecta
- Order: Coleoptera
- Suborder: Polyphaga
- Infraorder: Scarabaeiformia
- Family: Scarabaeidae
- Subfamily: Cetoniinae
- Tribe: Goliathini
- Subtribe: Coryphocerina
- Genus: Mecynorhina; Hope, 1837

Type species
- Scarabaeus polyphemus (Fabricius, 1781)

Synonyms
- Chelorrhina Burmeister, 1842; Mecynorrhina Schaum, 1848 (misspelling)

= Mecynorhina =

Genus of beetles

Mecynorhina (frequently misspelled as Mecynorrhina; the original spelling used a single "r" and the misspelling is not in prevailing usage, therefore not valid under the ICZN) are beetles from the subfamily Cetoniinae, tribe Goliathini. The genus was created by Frederick William Hope, in 1837.

According to the last work of De Palma & Frantz, the type species of the genus is Scarabaeus polyphemus Fabricius, 1781.

The genus is spread throughout the tropical African region.

== Taxonomy ==
=== Former classification ===
Formerly there were three species in the genus Mecynorhina:

- Mecynorhina oberthueri (Fairmaire, 1903)
- Mecynorhina torquata (Drury, 1782)
- Mecynorhina ugandensis (Moser, 1907)

Some authors designated ugandensis as a subspecies of torquata.

Mecynorhina oberthuri was long thought to be the rarest species in its genus, however, Jean-Pierre Lequeux discovered that it is common in the forests of Tanzania. This species is now reared by many amateurs.

The most variable species is Mecynorhina ugandensis where rarely two specimens are of the same aspect. Many variations have been illustrated by Allard.

=== Current classification ===
Following De Palma & Frantz (l.c.), the genus is now divided in five subgenera:

- Mecynorhina Hope, 1837
  - Mecynorhina polyphemus (Fabricius, 1781)
- Mecynorrhinella Marais & Holm, 1992
  - Mecynorhina oberthueri Fairmaire, 1903
  - Mecynorhina torquata (Drury, 1782)
  - Mecynorhina ugandensis (Moser, 1907) (often treated as a subspecies of Mecynorhina torquata)
- Chelorhinella De Palma & Frantz, 2010
  - Mecynorhina kraatzi (Moser, 1905)
  - Mecynorhina savagei Harris, 1844
- Megalorhina Westwood, 1847
  - Mecynorhina harrisi (Westwood, 1847)
  - Mecynorhina mukengiana (Kolbe, 1884)
  - Mecynorhina taverniersi Allard, 1990
- Amaurodes Westwood, 1844 (Synonym = Chelorrhina Burmeister, 1842)
  - Mecynorhina passerinii (Westwood, 1844)
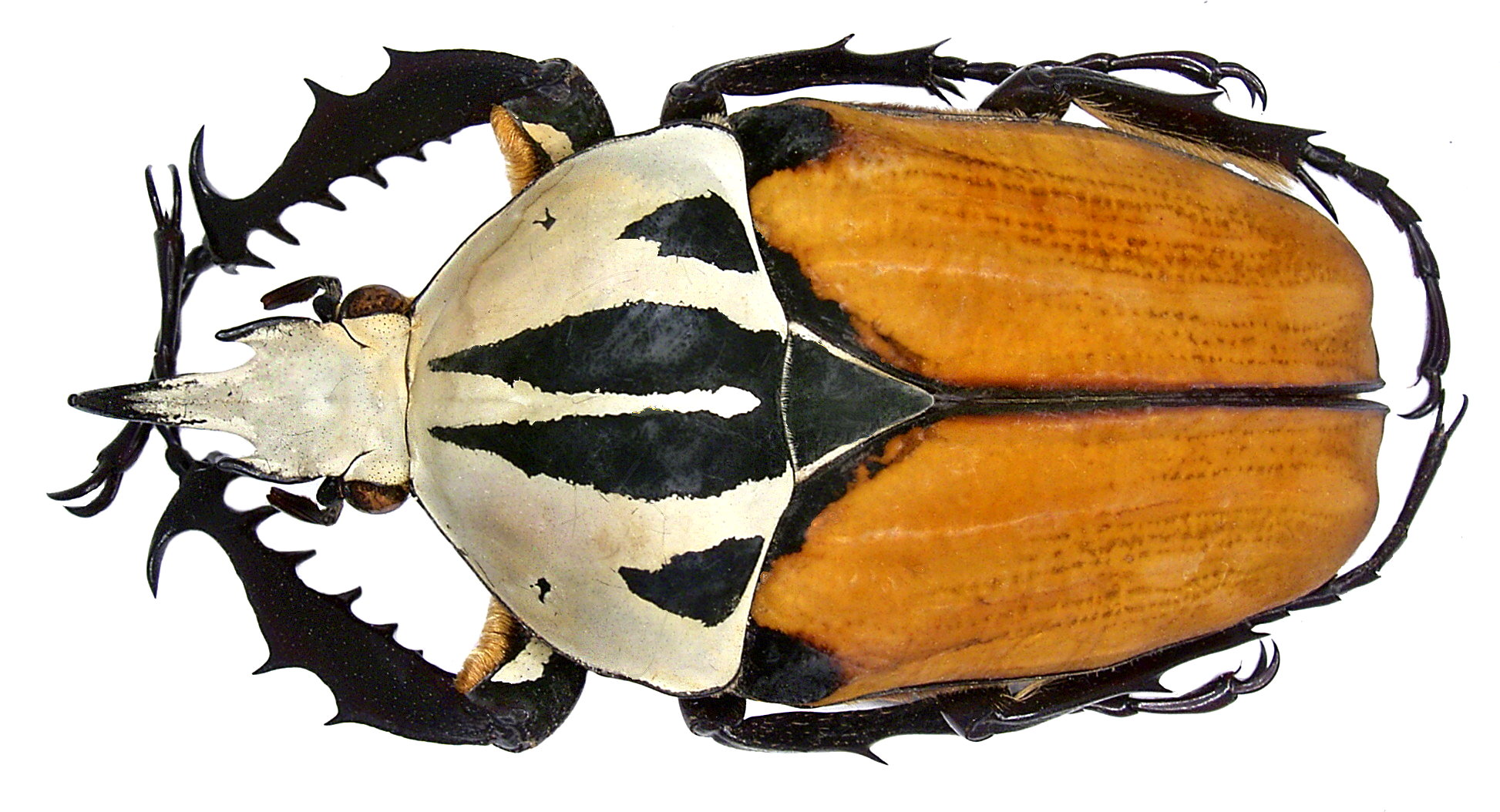
Mecynorhina oberthueri

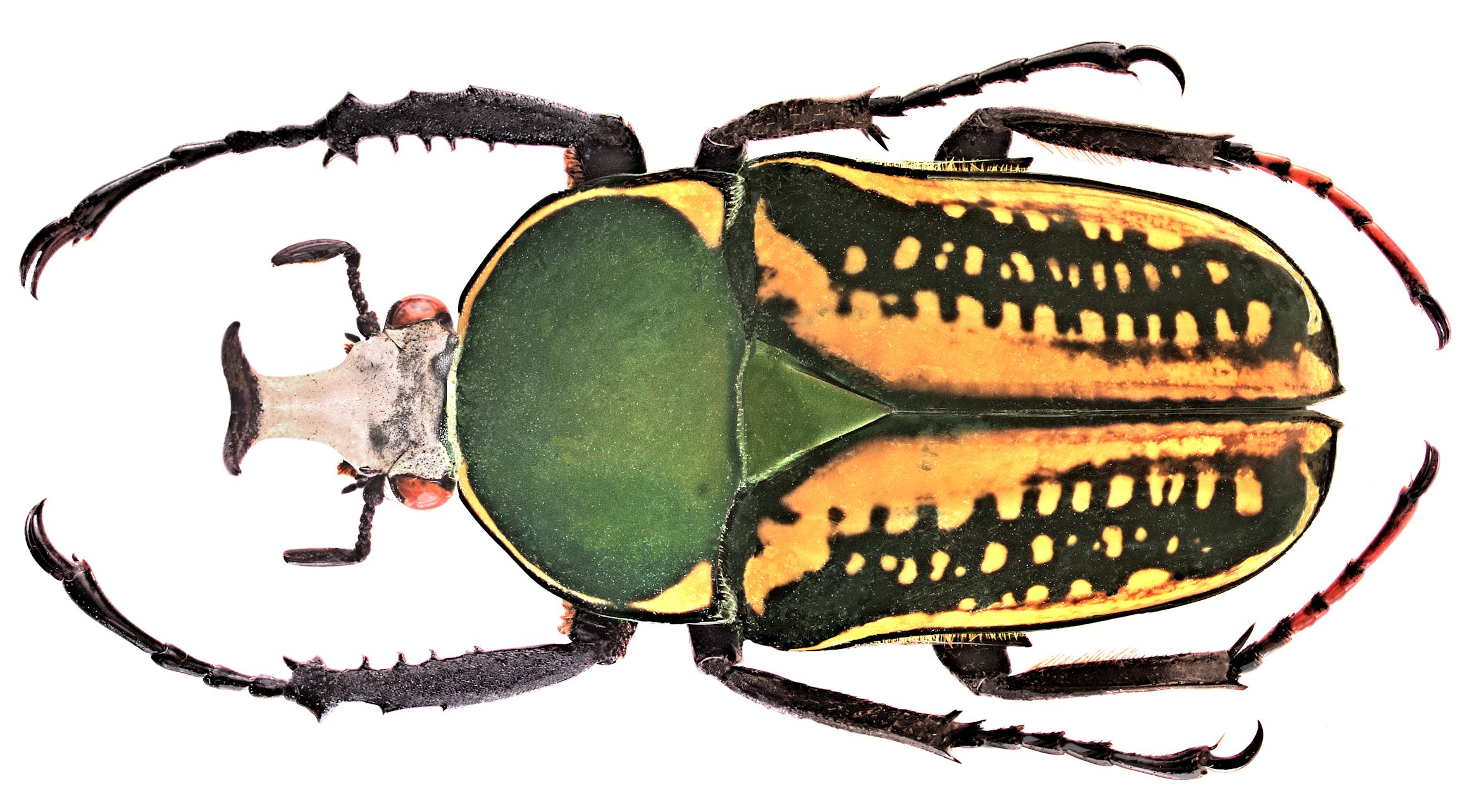
Mecynorhina harrisi harrisi
