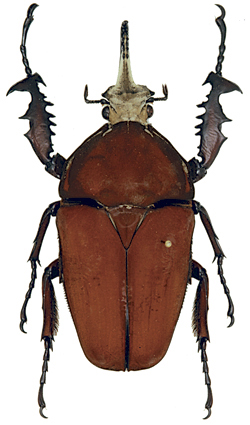

Scientific classification
- Kingdom: Animalia
- Phylum: Arthropoda
- Clade: Pancrustacea
- Class: Insecta
- Order: Coleoptera
- Suborder: Polyphaga
- Infraorder: Scarabaeiformia
- Family: Scarabaeidae
- Genus: Mecynorhina
- Species: M. ugandensis

Binomial name
- Mecynorhina ugandensis (Moser, 1907)

= Mecynorhina ugandensis =

Species of beetle

Mecynorhina ugandensis is a beetle from the subfamily Cetoniinae, tribe Goliathini, it was described by Julius Moser in 1907. As suggested by its name, it is found in Uganda, but it is also present in adjacent parts of DR Congo.

== Description ==
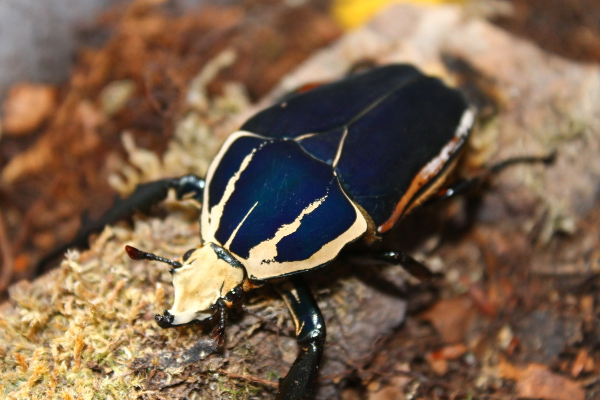
Male of M. ugandensis

It is a large beetle, with males reaching 85 mm and females 60 mm in length.

== Classification ==
According to the last work of De Palma & Frantz, this species is included in the subgenus Mecynorrhinella Marais and Holm, 1992, and is a subspecies of Mecynorhina torquata.

For a simplification, we will follow Allard considering ugandensis as a good species.

== Synonym ==
Zdenĕk Tesař described in 1935 Mecynorhina machulkai which is compared to Mecynorhina torquata, he seems not to know the species described by Moser.

== Variations ==
All the specimens of this species are rarely the same. Moser described it with red elytra ("elytris rubis"). In his paper, Tesař describes also several forms and illustrates many of them. Many varieties have been illustrated in The Beetles of the World, volume 7, plates 3–6. Here are other photos of the variations of the species, all the specimens are from Dr. Allard's collection.

Specimens of ugandensis
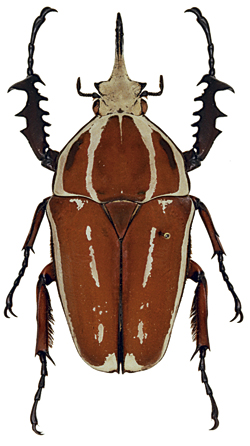
Mecynorhina ugandensis var. knirschi Tesař

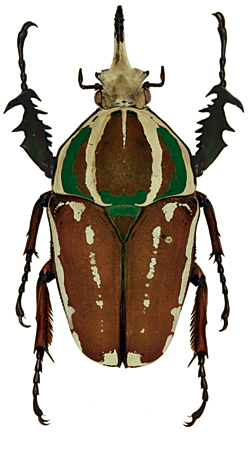
Mecynorhina ugandensis var. knirschi Tesař with green marks

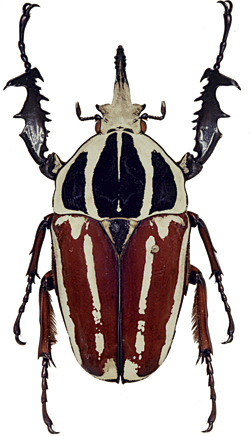
Mecynorhina ugandensis var. obenbergeri Tesař

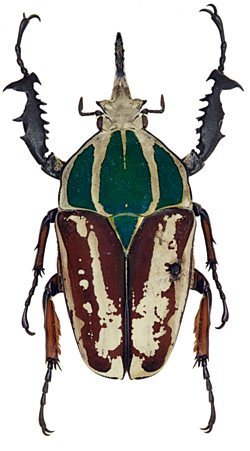
Mecynorhina ugandensis' var. kuntzeni Tesař
Specimens of ugandensis
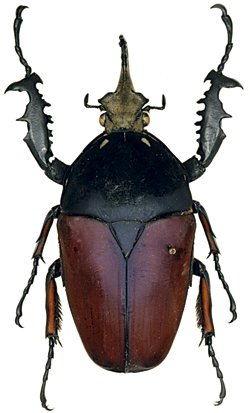
Mecynorhina ugandensis bicoloured form

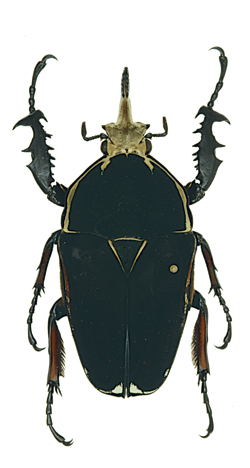
Mecynorhina ugandensis melanic form

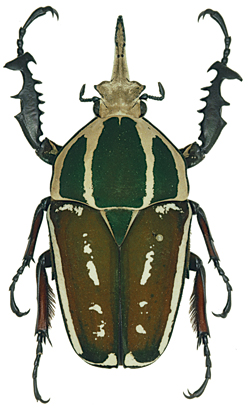
Mecynorhina ugandensis var.

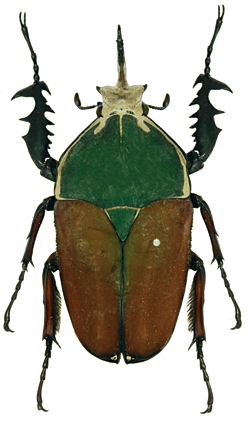
Mecynorhina ugandensis var. simplex Tesař
Specimens of ugandensis
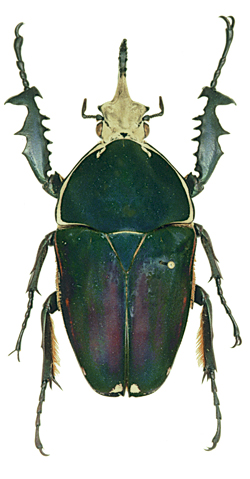
Mecynorhina ugandensis machulkai var. maculipennis Allard (in litteris)

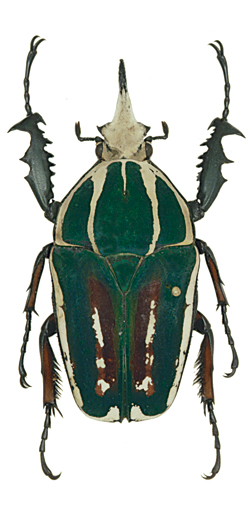
Mecynorhina ugandensis machulkai var.

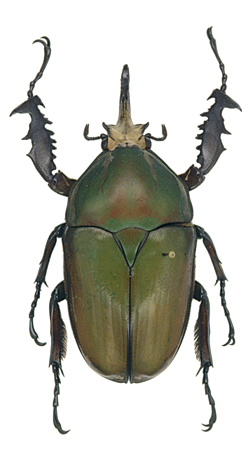
Mecynorhina ugandensis var. olivacea Tesař

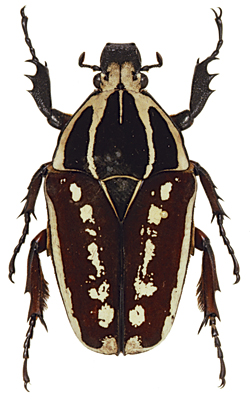
Mecynorhina ugandensis dark form, female
Specimens of ugandensis with small horns
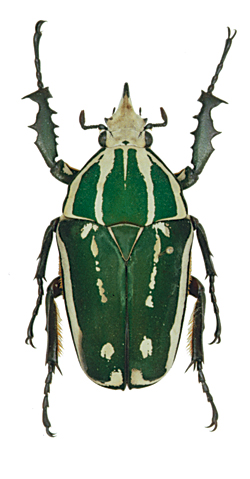
Mecynorhina ugandensis machulkai Tesař

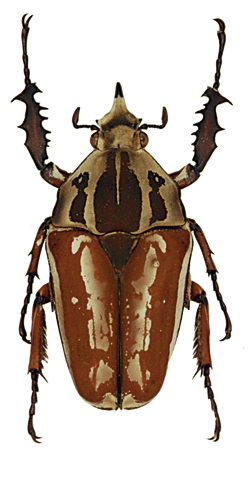
Mecynorhina ugandensis var. knirschi Tesař

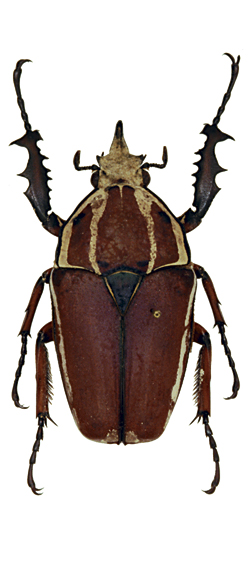
Mecynorhina ugandensis var. maculithorax Tesař

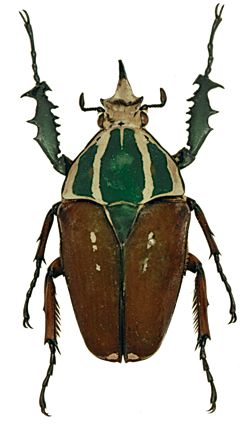
Mecynorhina ugandensis var.
