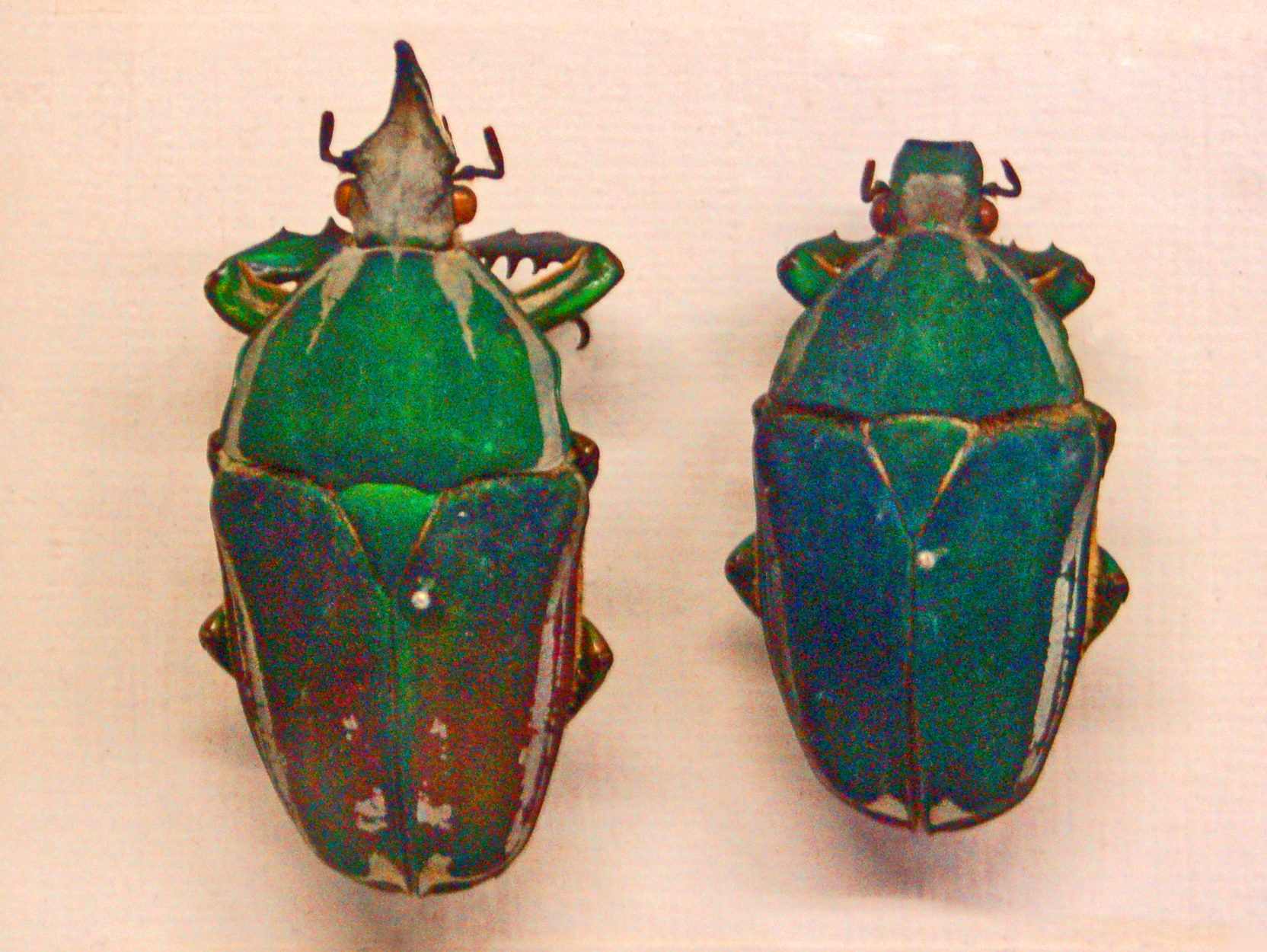
- Mecynorrhina torquata, male and female. Mounted specimen at the National Museum (Prague)

Scientific classification
- Kingdom: Animalia
- Phylum: Arthropoda
- Clade: Pancrustacea
- Class: Insecta
- Order: Coleoptera
- Suborder: Polyphaga
- Infraorder: Scarabaeiformia
- Family: Scarabaeidae
- Genus: Mecynorhina
- Species: M. torquata

Binomial name
- Mecynorhina torquata (Drury, 1782)

Synonyms
- Mecynorrhinella torquata (Drury, 1782); Cetonia torquata Drury, 1782

= Mecynorhina torquata =

Species of beetle

Mecynorhina torquata is a beetle from the subfamily Cetoniinae, tribe Goliathini.

== Description ==
Mecynorhina torquata is among the largest flower beetles in the world, only surpassed by the goliath beetles. It reaches about 55–85 millimetres (2.2–3.3 in) of length in the males, while the females are slightly smaller, reaching about 50–60 millimetres (2.0–2.4 in) of length. The basic colour is green with whitish markings on the elytra. The males have a horn in the forehead. The larvae can reach about 80 millimetres (3.1 in) of length in the males, with a weight of about 30-40g.

== Distribution ==
These beetles are native to tropical Africa, especially in the Democratic Republic of the Congo, Cameroon and Uganda.

== Research ==
Cyborgs of M. torquata have been created by implanting electrodes and a radio device. By sending radio signals to make the electrodes stimulate the muscles, it is possible to control the beetle's walking and flight.

== Subspecies ==
- Mecynorhina torquata immaculicollis (Kraatz, 1890)
- Mecynorhina torquata poggei (Kraatz, 1890)
- Mecynorhina torquata torquata (Drury, 1782)
- Mecynorhina torquata ugandensis Moser, 1907 – sometimes treated as a separate species
