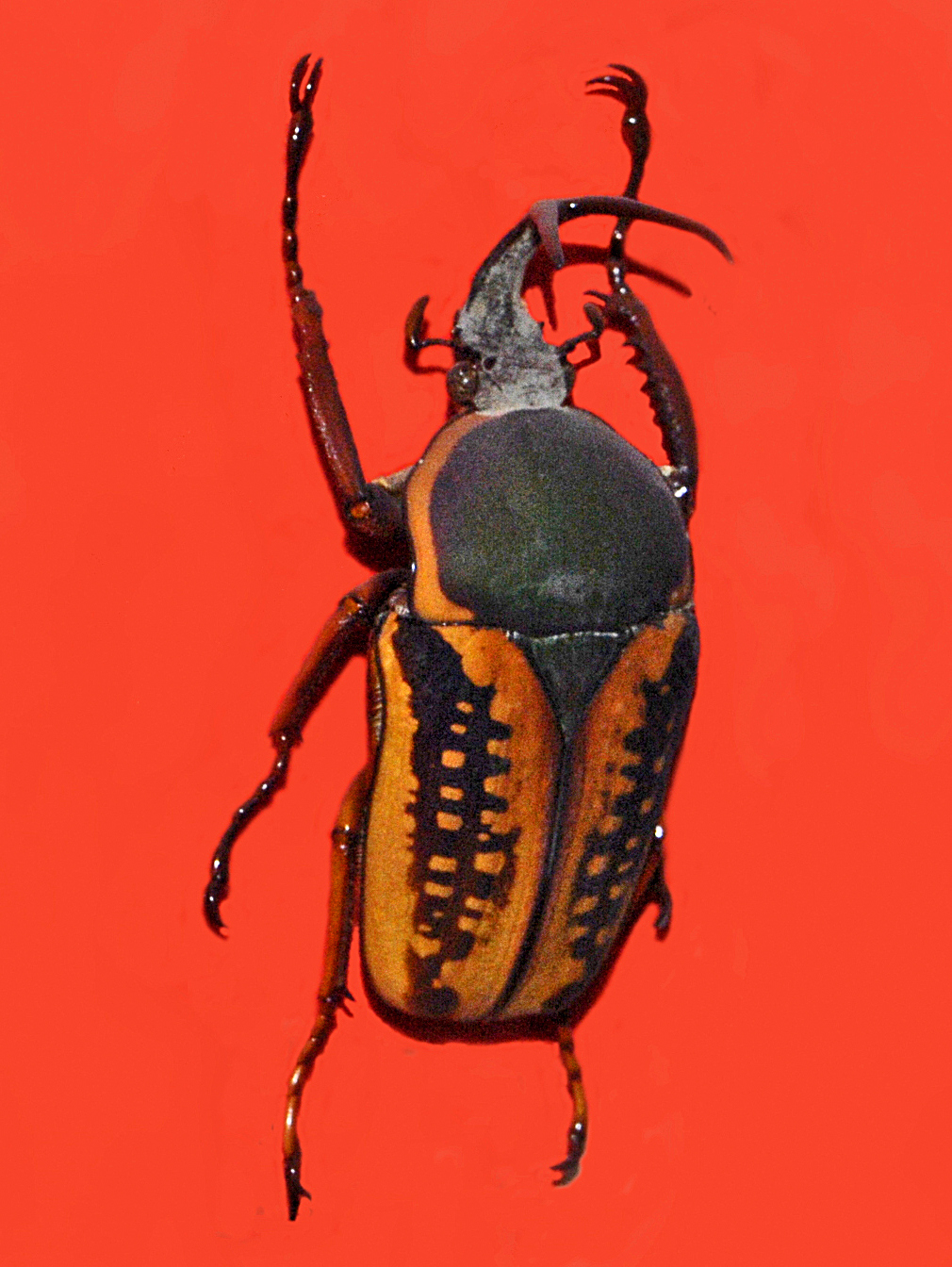
- Museum specimen of Mecynorhina harrisi, male

Scientific classification
- Kingdom: Animalia
- Phylum: Arthropoda
- Class: Insecta
- Order: Coleoptera
- Suborder: Polyphaga
- Infraorder: Scarabaeiformia
- Family: Scarabaeidae
- Genus: Mecynorhina
- Species: M. harrisi

Binomial name
- Mecynorhina harrisi (Westwood, 1847)

Synonyms
- Megalorhina harrisi Westwood, 1847

= Mecynorhina harrisi =

Species of beetle

Mecynorhina harrisi is a species of beetles belonging to the family Scarabaeidae, subfamily Cetoniinae.

== Subspecies ==
- Mecynorhina harrisi eximia (Aurivillius, 1886)
- Mecynorhina harrisi eximioides (Allard, 1989)
- Mecynorhina harrisi leptofurcata (Allard, 1985)
- Mecynorhina harrisi peregrina (Kolbe, 1895)
- Mecynorhina harrisi procera (Kolbe, 1884)
- Mecynorhina harrisi schaueri (Schürhoff, 1933)

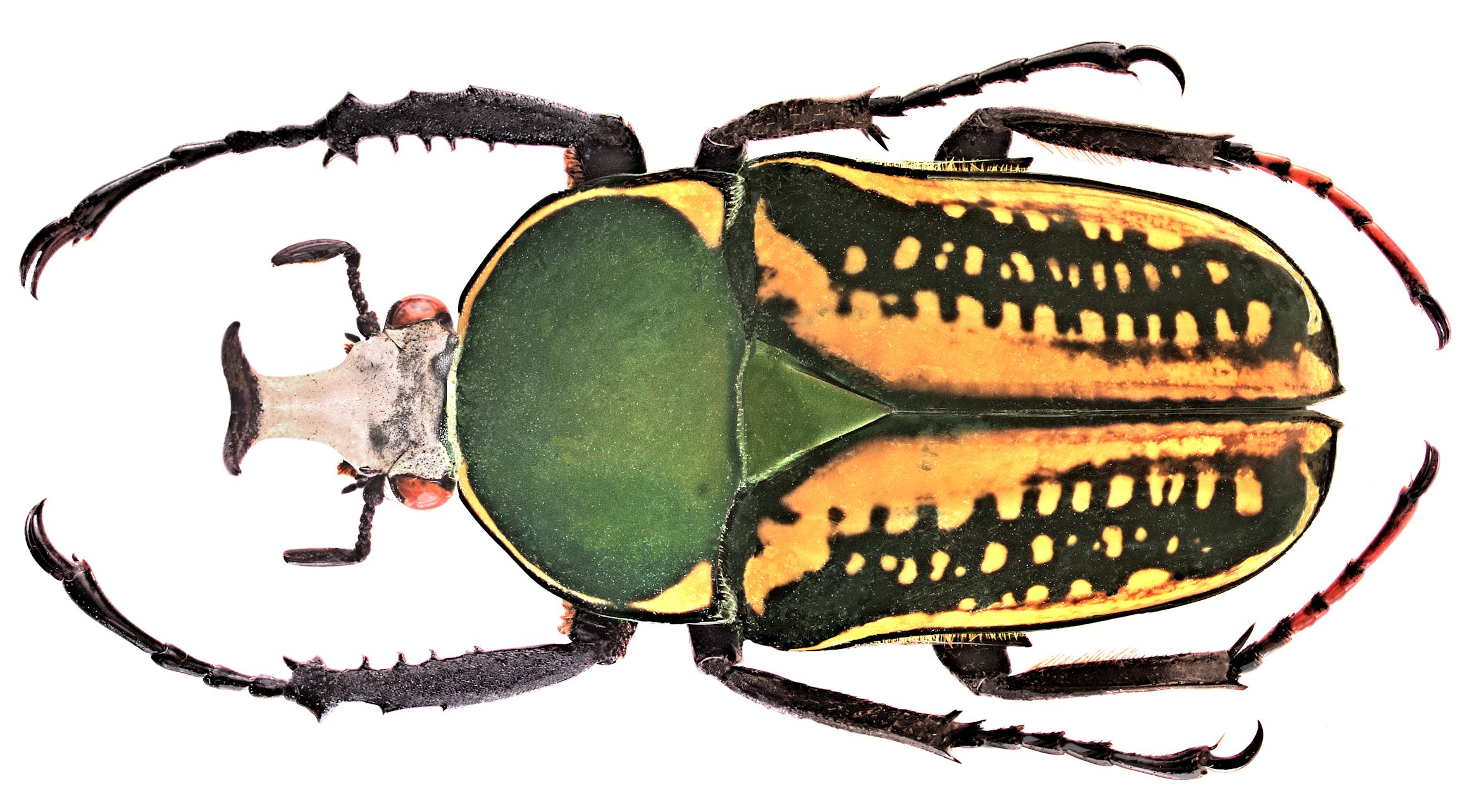
Mecynorhina harrisi harrisi

== Description ==
Mecynorhina harrisi can reach a length of about 30–50 millimetres (1.2–2.0 in). Coloration and pattern of these beetles are very variable, depending on subspecies. Pronotum may be red-brown or greenish. Elytra may be greenish, bluish or dark brown, with white or yellow spots and markings. Males show large forward-projecting horns.

== Distribution ==
This species can be found in Cameroon, Kenya, Tanzania and Uganda.
