= Polyphemus (sculpture) =

Sculpture by Auguste Rodin

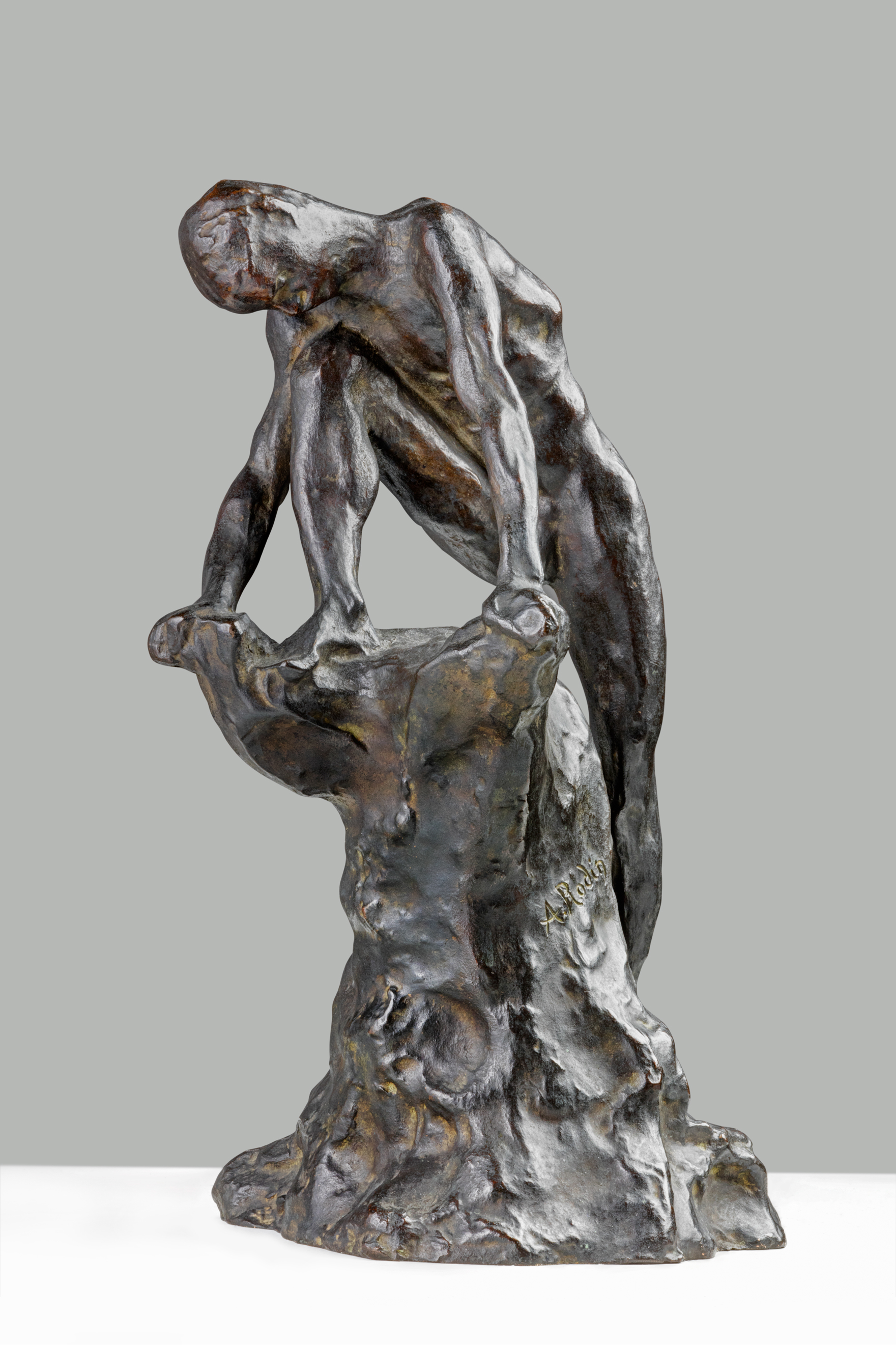
- The cast of the work in the Museo Soumaya
- Artist: Auguste Rodin
- Year: 1888

Polyphemus is an 1888 sculpture by Auguste Rodin, showing Polyphemus and his love for the Nereid Galatea, as told in Book XIII of Ovid's Metamorphoses.

== Gates of Hell ==
It was an initial study for the group of Polyphemus, Acis and Galatea at the centre of the right panel of The Gates of Hell. Several bronze studies of Polyphemus' torso survive, but there is no known monumental version of the complete group.

== Casts ==
A bronze cast of the work is now in the Museo Soumaya.

== See also ==
- List of sculptures by Auguste Rodin
