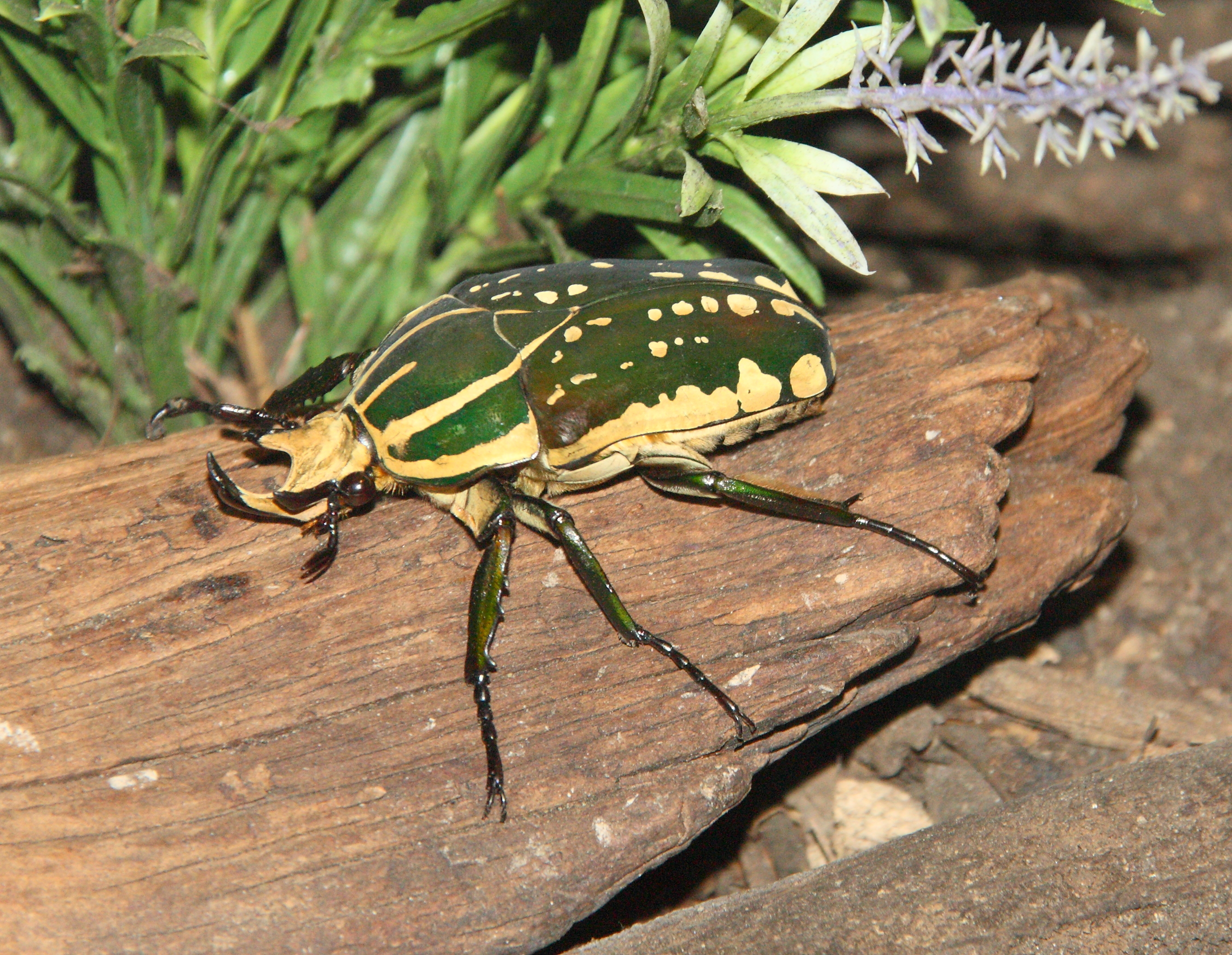
- Male
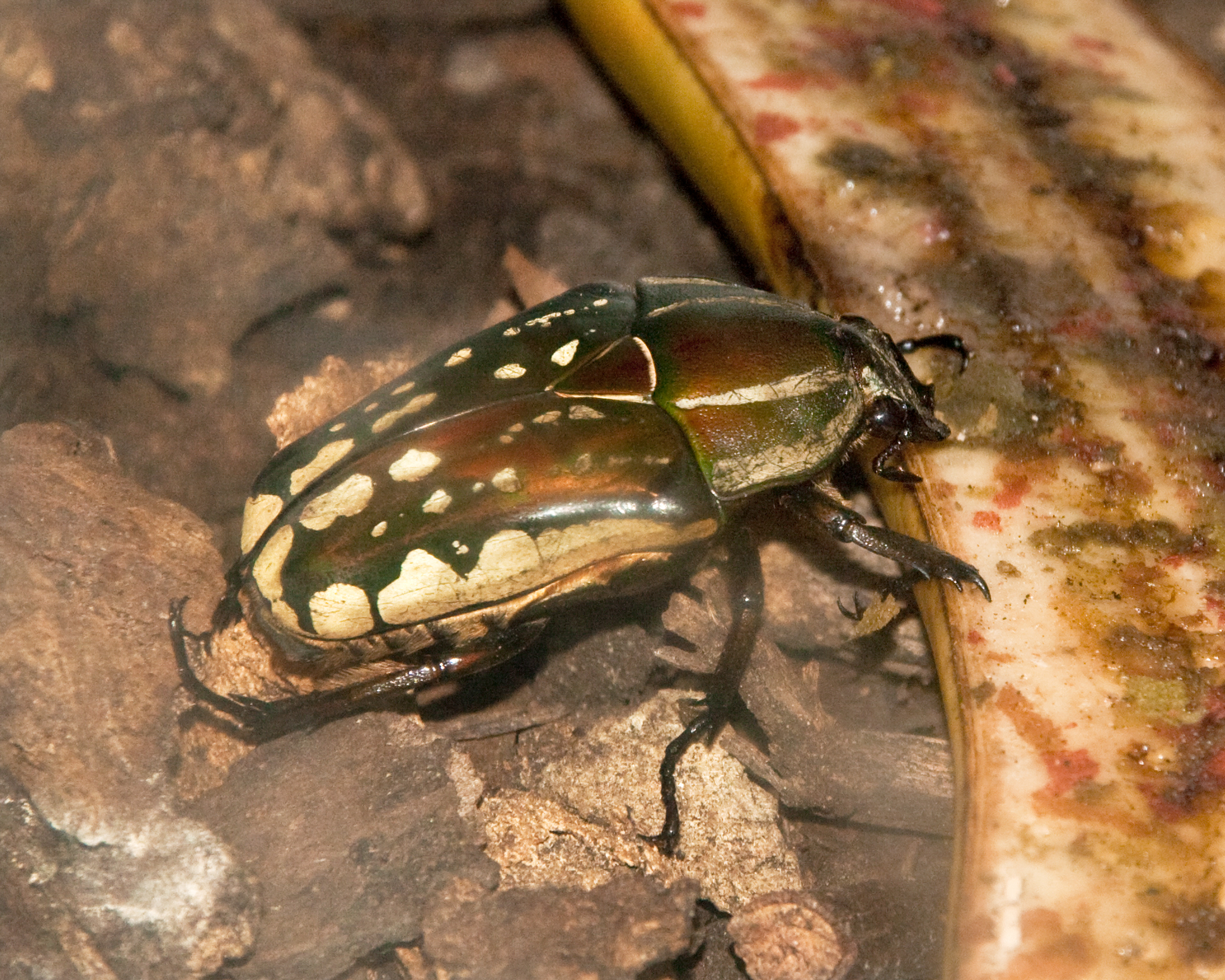
- Female

Scientific classification
- Kingdom: Animalia
- Phylum: Arthropoda
- Clade: Pancrustacea
- Class: Insecta
- Order: Coleoptera
- Suborder: Polyphaga
- Infraorder: Scarabaeiformia
- Family: Scarabaeidae
- Genus: Mecynorhina
- Species: M. polyphemus

Binomial name
- Mecynorhina polyphemus (Fabricius, 1781)

= Mecynorhina polyphemus =

Species of beetle

Mecynorhina polyphemus is a large scarab beetle of the subfamily Cetoniinae found in dense tropical African forests, sometimes called the Polyphemus beetle. It is a frequent feeder on fruits and sap flows from tree wounds.

The larvae develop in decomposing log compost. The third instar constructs an ovoid cocoon for metamorphosis and attaches it to a solid surface. In captivity, the instar may attach the cocoon to a glass container wall allowing the opportunity to view the transformation.

Male and female are dimorphic. The female has a shiny surface texture, reflective prismatic coloration, and no horns. The male has horns and flat, velvety coloration. Females are typically 35–55 mm, while males range from 35 to 80 mm.

== Subspecies ==
- Mecynorrhina polyphemus polyphemus Fabricius, 1781 (Ivory Coast, Ghana; Size: ♂ 44–72 mm; ♀ 41–50 mm)
- Mecynorrhina polyphemus confluens Kraatz, 1890 (Democratic Republic of the Congo, Republic of the Congo, Ivory Coast, Gabon and Uganda; Size: ♂ 42–80 mm; ♀ 42–55 mm)
