= List of Bembix species =

This is a list of 347 species in Bembix, a genus of sand wasps in the family Bembicidae.

== Bembix species ==
- Bembix abercornensis Arnold, 1960^{i c g}
- Bembix abragensis Priesner, 1958^{i c g}
- Bembix admirabilis Radoszkowski, 1893^{i c g}
- Bembix affinis Dahlbom, 1844^{i c g}
- Bembix afra Handlirsch, 1893^{i c g}
- Bembix agrestis J. Parker, 1929^{i c g}
- Bembix alacris J. Parker, 1929^{i c g}
- Bembix albata J. Parker, 1929^{i c g}
- Bembix albicapilla Arnold, 1946^{i c g}
- Bembix albidula R. Turner, 1917^{i c g}
- Bembix albofasciata F. Smith, 1873^{i c g}
- Bembix aldabra J. Parker, 1929^{c g}
- Bembix alfierii Priesner, 1958^{i c g}
- Bembix allunga Evans and Matthews, 1973^{i c g}
- Bembix americana Fabricius, 1793^{i c g b}
- Bembix amoena Handlirsch, 1893^{i c g b}
- Bembix anomalipes Arnold, 1929^{i c g}
- Bembix antoni Krombein and van der Vecht, 1987^{i c g}
- Bembix arenaria Handlirsch, 1893^{i c g}
- Bembix arlettae de Beaumont, 1970^{i c g}
- Bembix arnoldi Arnold, 1929^{i c g}
- Bembix atra Kazenas, 1980^{c g}
- Bembix atrifrons F. Smith, 1856^{i c g}
- Bembix atrospinosa R. Turner, 1917^{i c g}
- Bembix aureofasciata R. Turner, 1910^{i c g}
- Bembix barbara Handlirsch, 1893^{i c g}
- Bembix baringa Evans and Matthews, 1973^{i c g}
- Bembix bataviana Strand, 1910^{i c g}
- Bembix baumanni Handlirsch, 1893^{i c g}
- Bembix bazilanensis Yasumatsu, 1933^{i c g}
- Bembix belfragei Cresson, 1873^{i c g}
- Bembix bellatrix J. Parker, 1929^{i c g}
- Bembix bequaerti Arnold, 1929^{i c g}
- Bembix berontha Evans and Matthews, 1973^{i c g}
- Bembix bicolor Radoszkowski, 1877^{i c g}
- Bembix bidentata Vander Linden, 1829^{i c g}
- Bembix boaliri Evans and Matthews, 1973^{i c g}
- Bembix boharti Griswold, 1983^{i c g}
- Bembix boonamin Evans and Matthews, 1973^{i c g}
- Bembix borneana Cameron, 1901^{i c g}
- Bembix borrei Handlirsch, 1893^{i c g}
- Bembix brachyptera Arnold, 1952^{i c g}
- Bembix braunsii Handlirsch, 1893^{i c g}
- Bembix brullei Guérin-Méneville, 1831^{i c g}
- Bembix brunneri Handlirsch, 1893^{i c g}
- Bembix bubalus Handlirsch, 1893^{i c g}
- Bembix budha Handlirsch, 1893^{i c g}
- Bembix buettikeri Guichard, 1989^{i c g}
- Bembix bulloni Giner Marí, 1945^{i c g}
- Bembix buntor Evans and Matthews, 1973^{i c g}
- Bembix burando Evans and Matthews, 1973^{i c g}
- Bembix burraburra Evans and Matthews, 1973^{i c g}
- Bembix cameroni Rohwer, 1912^{i c g}
- Bembix cameronis Handlirsch, 1893^{i c g}
- Bembix canescens (Gmelin, 1790)^{i c g}
- Bembix capensis Lepeletier, 1845^{i c g}
- Bembix capicola Handlirsch, 1893^{i c g}
- Bembix carinata F. Smith, 1856^{i c g}
- Bembix carripan Evans and Matthews, 1973^{i c g}
- Bembix chlorotica Spinola, 1839^{i c g}
- Bembix chopardi Berland, 1950^{i c g}
- Bembix ciliciensis de Beaumont, 1967^{i c g}
- Bembix cinctella Handlirsch, 1893^{i c g}
- Bembix cinerea Handlirsch, 1893^{i c g}
- Bembix citripes Taschenberg, 1870^{i c g}
- Bembix clypealis Guichard, 1989^{i c g}
- Bembix comantis J. Parker, 1929^{i c g}
- Bembix compedita R. Turner, 1913^{i c g}
- Bembix cooba Evans and Matthews, 1973^{i c g}
- Bembix coonundura Evans and Matthews, 1973^{i c g}
- Bembix cultrifera Arnold, 1929^{i c g}
- Bembix cursitans Handlirsch, 1893^{i c g}
- Bembix dahlbomii Handlirsch, 1893^{i c g}
- Bembix denticauda Arnold, 1946^{i c g}
- Bembix dentilabris Handlirsch, 1893^{i c g}
- Bembix dilatata Radoszkowski, 1877^{i c g}
- Bembix diversidens Arnold, 1946^{i c g}
- Bembix diversipennis F. Smith, 1873^{i c g}
- Bembix diversipes F. Morawitz, 1889^{i c g}
- Bembix dubia Gussakovskij, 1933^{c g}
- Bembix eburnea Radoszkowski, 1877^{i c g}
- Bembix egens Handlirsch, 1893^{i c g}
- Bembix eleebana Evans and Matthews, 1973^{i c g}
- Bembix eucla Evans, 1990^{i c g}
- Bembix fantiorum Arnold, 1951^{i c g}
- Bembix filipina Lohrmann, 1942^{i c g}
- Bembix finschii Handlirsch, 1893^{i c g}
- Bembix fischeri Spinola, 1839^{i c g}
- Bembix fischeroides Magretti, 1892^{i c g}
- Bembix flavescens F. Smith, 1856^{i c g}
- Bembix flavicincta Turner, 1912^{i c g}
- Bembix flavifrons F. Smith, 1856^{i c g}
- Bembix flavipes F. Smith, 1856^{i c g}
- Bembix flaviventris F. Smith, 1873^{i c g}
- Bembix forcipata Handlirsch, 1893^{i c g}
- Bembix formosana Bischoff, 1913^{i c g}
- Bembix fossoria F. Smith, 1878^{i c g}
- Bembix fraudulenta Arnold, 1929^{i c g}
- Bembix freygessneri Morice, 1897^{i c g}
- Bembix frommeri R. Bohart, 1970^{i c g}
- Bembix frontalis Olivier, 1789^{i c g}
- Bembix fucosa J. Parker, 1929^{i c g}
- Bembix fumida J. Parker, 1929^{i c g}
- Bembix furcata Erichson, 1842^{i c g}
- Bembix fuscipennis Lepeletier, 1845^{i c g}
- Bembix galactina Dufour, 1854^{i c g}
- Bembix gazella Guichard, 1989^{i c g}
- Bembix gelane Evans and Matthews, 1973^{i c g}
- Bembix geneana A. Costa, 1867^{i c g}
- Bembix generosa J. Parker, 1929^{i c g}
- Bembix gillaspyi Evans and Matthews, 1968^{i c g}
- Bembix ginjulla Evans and Matthews, 1973^{i c g}
- Bembix glauca Fabricius, 1787^{i c g}
- Bembix gobiensis Tsuneki, 1971^{c g}
- Bembix goyarra Evans and Matthews, 1973^{i c g}
- Bembix gracilens J. Parker, 1929^{i c g}
- Bembix gracilis Handlirsch, 1893^{c g}
- Bembix grisescens Dahlbom, 1845^{i c g}
- Bembix gunamarra Evans and Matthews, 1973^{i c g}
- Bembix gurindji Evans, 1982^{i c g}
- Bembix hameri Guichard, 1989^{i c g}
- Bembix handlirschi Cameron, 1901^{i c g}
- Bembix harenarum Arnold, 1929^{i c g}
- Bembix hauseri Schmid-Egger, 2011^{i c g}
- Bembix hedickei Giner Marí, 1945^{i c g}
- Bembix hesione Bingham, 1893^{i c g}
- Bembix heteracantha Gussakovskij, 1933^{i c g}
- Bembix hexaspila J. Parker, 1929^{i c g}
- Bembix hinei J. Parker, 1917^{i c g}
- Bembix hofufensis Guichard, 1989^{i c g}
- Bembix hokarra Evans and Matthews, 1973^{i c g}
- Bembix holoni Bytinski-Salz, 1955^{i c g}
- Bembix hova de Saussure, 1892^{i c g}
- Bembix iliensis Kazenas, 1980^{c g}
- Bembix incognita J. Parker, 1929^{i c g}
- Bembix infumata Handlirsch, 1893^{i c g}
- Bembix inscripta Dahlbom, 1844^{i c g}
- Bembix integra Panzer, 1801^{i c g}
- Bembix inyoensis L. Kimsey and R. Kimsey, 1981^{i c g}
- Bembix irritata Nurse, 1903^{i c g}
- Bembix isabellae de Beaumont, 1970^{i c g}
- Bembix joeli Bytinski-Salz, 1955^{i c g}
- Bembix johnstoni R. Turner, 1912^{i c g}
- Bembix junodi Arnold, 1929^{c g}
- Bembix kamulla Evans and Matthews, 1973^{i c g}
- Bembix karooensis Gess, 1986^{i c g}
- Bembix kazakhstanica Kazenas, 1980^{c g}
- Bembix kirgisica F. Morawitz, 1891^{c g}
- Bembix kohlii Morice, 1897^{i c g}
- Bembix kora Evans and Matthews, 1973^{i c g}
- Bembix kriechbaumeri Handlirsch, 1893^{i c g}
- Bembix kununurra Evans and Matthews, 1973^{i c g}
- Bembix labiata Fabricius, 1798^{i c g}
- Bembix labidura Handlirsch, 1893^{i c g}
- Bembix lactea Cameron, 1901^{i c g}
- Bembix laeta J. Parker, 1929^{i c g}
- Bembix lamellata Handlirsch, 1893^{i c g}
- Bembix latebrosa Kohl, 1909^{i c g}
- Bembix latifasciata R. Turner, 1912^{i c g}
- Bembix latigenata Willink, 1947^{i c g}
- Bembix latitarsis Handlirsch, 1893^{i c g}
- Bembix leeuwinensis R. Turner, 1915^{i c g}
- Bembix levis J. Parker, 1929^{i c g}
- Bembix liberiensis J. Parker, 1929^{i c g}
- Bembix lineatifrons Cameron, 1908^{i c g}
- Bembix littoralis R. Turner, 1908^{i c g}
- Bembix liturata R. Turner, 1917^{i c g}
- Bembix liventis J. Parker, 1929^{i c g}
- Bembix lobatifrons R. Turner, 1913^{i c g}
- Bembix lobimana Handlirsch, 1893^{i c g}
- Bembix longipennis J. Parker, 1929^{i c g}
- Bembix loorea Evans and Matthews, 1973^{i c g}
- Bembix loupata J. Parker, 1929^{i c g}
- Bembix lunata Fabricius, 1793^{i c g}
- Bembix lusca Spinola, 1839^{i c g}
- Bembix lutescens Radoszkowski, 1877^{i c g}
- Bembix luzonensis J. Parker, 1929^{i c g}
- Bembix madecassa de Saussure, 1890^{i c g}
- Bembix magarra Evans and Matthews, 1973^{i c g}
- Bembix magdalenae C. Fox, 1926^{i c g}
- Bembix maidli von Schulthess, 1927^{i c g}
- Bembix maldivensis Cameron, 1901^{i c g}
- Bembix maliki Evans and Matthews, 1973^{i c g}
- Bembix mareeba Evans and Matthews, 1973^{i c g}
- Bembix marhra Evans and Matthews, 1973^{i c g}
- Bembix marsupiata Handlirsch, 1893^{i c g}
- Bembix massaica Cameron, 1908^{i c g}
- Bembix megadonta Cameron, 1904^{i c g}
- Bembix megerlei Dahlbom, 1845^{i c g}
- Bembix melanaspis J. Parker, 1917^{i c g}
- Bembix melancholica F. Smith, 1856^{i c g}
- Bembix melanopa Handlirsch, 1893^{i c g}
- Bembix melanura F. Morawitz, 1889^{c g}
- Bembix merceti J. Parker, 1929^{i c g}
- Bembix mianga Evans and Matthews, 1973^{i c g}
- Bembix mildei Dahlbom, 1845^{i c g}
- Bembix mima Handlirsch, 1893^{i c g}
- Bembix mindanaonis Tsuneki, 1992^{i c g}
- Bembix minya Evans and Matthews, 1973^{i c g}
- Bembix modesta Handlirsch, 1893^{i c g}
- Bembix moebii Handlirsch, 1893^{i c g}
- Bembix mokari Evans and Matthews, 1973^{i c g}
- Bembix moma Evans and Matthews, 1973^{i c g}
- Bembix monedula Handlirsch, 1893^{i c g}
- Bembix moonga Evans and Matthews, 1973^{i c g}
- Bembix multipicta F. Smith, 1873^{i c g}
- Bembix mundurra Evans and Matthews, 1973^{i c g}
- Bembix munta Evans and Matthews, 1973^{i c g}
- Bembix musca Handlirsch, 1893^{i c g}
- Bembix namibensis Gess, 1986^{i c g}
- Bembix nasuta Morice, 1897^{c g}
- Bembix nigrispina Guichard, 1989^{i c g}
- Bembix nigrocornuta J. Parker, 1929^{c g}
- Bembix nigropectinata R. Turner, 1936^{i c g}
- Bembix nilotica Priesner, 1958^{i c g}
- Bembix niponica F. Smith, 1873^{i c g}
- Bembix notabilis Arnold, 1952^{i c g}
- Bembix nubilipennis Cresson, 1873^{i c g}
- Bembix nupera J. Parker, 1929^{i c g}
- Bembix obiri Evans, 1982^{i c g}
- Bembix obtusa R. Turner, 1917^{i c g}
- Bembix occidentalis W. Fox, 1893^{i c g b}
- Bembix ochracea Handlirsch, 1893^{i c g}
- Bembix octosetosa Lohrmann, 1942^{i c g}
- Bembix oculata Panzer, 1801^{i c g}
- Bembix odontopyga R. Turner, 1917^{i c g}
- Bembix olba Evans and Matthews, 1973^{i c g}
- Bembix olivacea Fabricius, 1787^{i c g}
- Bembix olivata Dahlbom, 1845^{i c g}
- Bembix omanensis Guichard, 1989^{i c g}
- Bembix oomborra Evans and Matthews, 1973^{i c g}
- Bembix opinabilis J. Parker, 1929^{i c g}
- Bembix orientalis Handlirsch, 1893^{i c g}
- Bembix ornatilabiata Cameron, 1908^{i c g}
- Bembix ourapilla Evans and Matthews, 1973^{i c g}
- Bembix ovans Bingham, 1893^{i c g}
- Bembix palaestinensis Lohrmann, 1942^{i c g}
- Bembix pallescens Priesner, 1958^{i c g}
- Bembix pallida Radoszkowski, 1877^{i c g}
- Bembix pallidipicta F. Smith, 1873^{i c g}
- Bembix palmata F. Smith, 1856^{i c g}
- Bembix palona Evans and Matthews, 1973^{i c g}
- Bembix papua Handlirsch, 1893^{i c g}
- Bembix parkeri Lohrmann, 1942^{i c g}
- Bembix parvula F. Morawitz, 1897^{c g}
- Bembix pectinipes Handlirsch, 1893^{i c g}
- Bembix persa von Schulthess, 1927^{i c g}
- Bembix persimilis R. Turner, 1917^{i c g}
- Bembix physopoda Handlirsch, 1893^{i c g}
- Bembix pikati Evans and Matthews, 1973^{i c g}
- Bembix pillara Evans and Matthews, 1973^{i c g}
- Bembix pinguis Handlirsch, 1893^{i c g}
- Bembix piraporae J. Parker, 1929^{i c g}
- Bembix placida F. Smith, 1856^{i c g}
- Bembix planifrons F. Morawitz, 1891^{i c g}
- Bembix portchinskii Radoszkowski, 1884^{i c g}
- Bembix priesneri de Beaumont, 1966^{i c g}
- Bembix promontorii Lohrmann, 1942^{i c g}
- Bembix pugillatrix Handlirsch, 1893^{i c g}
- Bembix pulka Evans and Matthews, 1973^{i c g}
- Bembix quadrimaculata Taschenberg, 1870^{i c g}
- Bembix quinquespinosa J. Parker, 1929^{i c g}
- Bembix radoszkowskyi Handlirsch, 1893^{i c g}
- Bembix rava Arnold, 1952^{i c g}
- Bembix recurva J. Parker, 1929^{i c g}
- Bembix refuscata J. Parker, 1929^{i c g}
- Bembix regia J. Parker, 1929^{i c g}
- Bembix regnata J. Parker, 1929^{i c g}
- Bembix relegata R. Turner, 1917^{i c g}
- Bembix residua J. Parker, 1929^{i c g}
- Bembix robusta Lohrmann, 1942^{i c g}
- Bembix rochei Guichard, 1989^{i c g}
- Bembix rostrata (Linnaeus, 1758)^{i c g}
- Bembix rufiventris Priesner, 1958^{i c g}
- Bembix rugosa J. Parker, 1917^{i c g}
- Bembix saadensis Guichard, 1989^{i c g}
- Bembix salina Lohrmann, 1942^{i c g}
- Bembix saudi Guichard, 1989^{i c g}
- Bembix sayi Cresson, 1865^{i c g b}
- Bembix scaura Arnold, 1929^{i c g}
- Bembix scotti R. Turner, 1912^{i c g}
- Bembix seculata J. Parker, 1929^{i c g}
- Bembix semoni Cameron, 1905^{i c g}
- Bembix severa F. Smith, 1873^{i c g}
- Bembix sibilans Handlirsch, 1893^{i c g}
- Bembix silvestrii Maidl, 1914^{i c g}
- Bembix sinuata Panzer, 1804^{i c g}
- Bembix smithii Handlirsch, 1893^{i c g}
- Bembix spatulata J. Parker, 1929^{i c g}
- Bembix spiritalis J. Parker, 1929^{i c g}
- Bembix splendida Arnold, 1951^{i c g}
- Bembix stadelmanni Handlirsch, 1893^{i c g}
- Bembix stenebdoma J. Parker, 1917^{c g}
- Bembix stenobdoma J. Parker, 1917^{i}
- Bembix subeburnea Tsuneki, 1971^{c g}
- Bembix sulphurescens Dahlbom, 1844^{i c g}
- Bembix tadzhika Kazenas, 1980^{i c g}
- Bembix taiwana Bischoff, 1913^{i c g}
- Bembix tangadee Evans, 1990^{i c g}
- Bembix tarsata Latreille, 1809^{i c g}
- Bembix taschenbergi Handlirsch, 1893^{i c g}
- Bembix tenuifasciata J. Parker, 1929^{i c g}
- Bembix texana Cresson, 1873^{i c g b}
- Bembix thooma Evans and Matthews, 1973^{i c g}
- Bembix tibooburra Evans and Matthews, 1973^{i c g}
- Bembix torosa J. Parker, 1929^{i c g}
- Bembix tranquebarica (Gmelin, 1790)^{i c g}
- Bembix transcaspica Radoszkowski, 1893^{i c g}
- Bembix trepida Handlirsch, 1893^{i c g}
- Bembix triangulifera Arnold, 1944^{i c g}
- Bembix tricolor Dahlbom, 1844^{i c g}
- Bembix trimaculata Kazenas, 1980^{c g}
- Bembix troglodytes Handlirsch, 1893^{i c g}
- Bembix truncata Handlirsch, 1893^{i c g}
- Bembix tuberculiventris R. Turner, 1908^{i c g}
- Bembix turca Dahlbom, 1845^{i c g}
- Bembix ugandensis R. Turner, 1913^{i c g}
- Bembix uloola Evans and Matthews, 1973^{i c g}
- Bembix ulula Arnold, 1929^{i c g}
- Bembix undeneya Evans and Matthews, 1973^{i c g}
- Bembix undulata Spinola, 1839^{i c g}
- Bembix usheri Arnold, 1960^{i c g}
- Bembix variabilis F. Smith, 1856^{i c g}
- Bembix vasta Lohrmann, 1942^{i c g}
- Bembix velox Handlirsch, 1893^{i c g}
- Bembix venusta Arnold, 1929^{i c g}
- Bembix versuta Arnold, 1946^{i c g}
- Bembix vespiformis F. Smith, 1856^{i c g}
- Bembix wadamiri Evans and Matthews, 1973^{i c g}
- Bembix wagleri Gistel, 1857^{i c g}
- Bembix wangoola Evans and Matthews, 1973^{i c g}
- Bembix wanna Evans and Matthews, 1973^{i c g}
- Bembix warawara Evans and Matthews, 1973^{i c g}
- Bembix weberi Handlirsch, 1893^{c g}
- Bembix weema Evans and Matthews, 1973^{i c g}
- Bembix westermanni Spinola, 1839^{i c g}
- Bembix westonii Bingham, 1894^{i c g}
- Bembix wilcannia Evans and Matthews, 1973^{i c g}
- Bembix wiluna Evans and Matthews, 1973^{i c g}
- Bembix wollowra Evans and Matthews, 1973^{i c g}
- Bembix wolpa Evans and Matthews, 1973^{i c g}
- Bembix wowine Evans and Matthews, 1973^{i c g}
- Bembix yalta Evans and Matthews, 1973^{i c g}
- Bembix yunkara Evans and Matthews, 1973^{i c g}
- Bembix zarudnyi Gussakovskij, 1933^{i c g}
- Bembix zinni Gess, 1986^{i c g}
- Bembix zonata Klug, 1835^{i c g}

Data sources: i = ITIS, c = Catalogue of Life, g = GBIF, b = Bugguide.net
