= Steniolia eremica =

Scientific classification
- Domain: Eukaryota
- Kingdom: Animalia
- Phylum: Arthropoda
- Class: Insecta
- Order: Hymenoptera
- Family: Bembicidae
- Tribe: Bembicini
- Subtribe: Stictiellina
- Genus: Steniolia
- Species: S. eremica

Binomial name
- Steniolia eremica Gillaspy, 1964

Species of wasp

Steniolia eremica is a species of sand wasp in the family Bembicidae. It is found in Central America and North America.
