= Didineis peculiaris =

Scientific classification
- Domain: Eukaryota
- Kingdom: Animalia
- Phylum: Arthropoda
- Class: Insecta
- Order: Hymenoptera
- Family: Bembicidae
- Tribe: Alyssontini
- Genus: Didineis
- Species: D. peculiaris

Binomial name
- Didineis peculiaris W. Fox, 1894

Species of wasp

Didineis peculiaris is a species of wasp in the family Bembicidae. It is found in Central America and North America.
