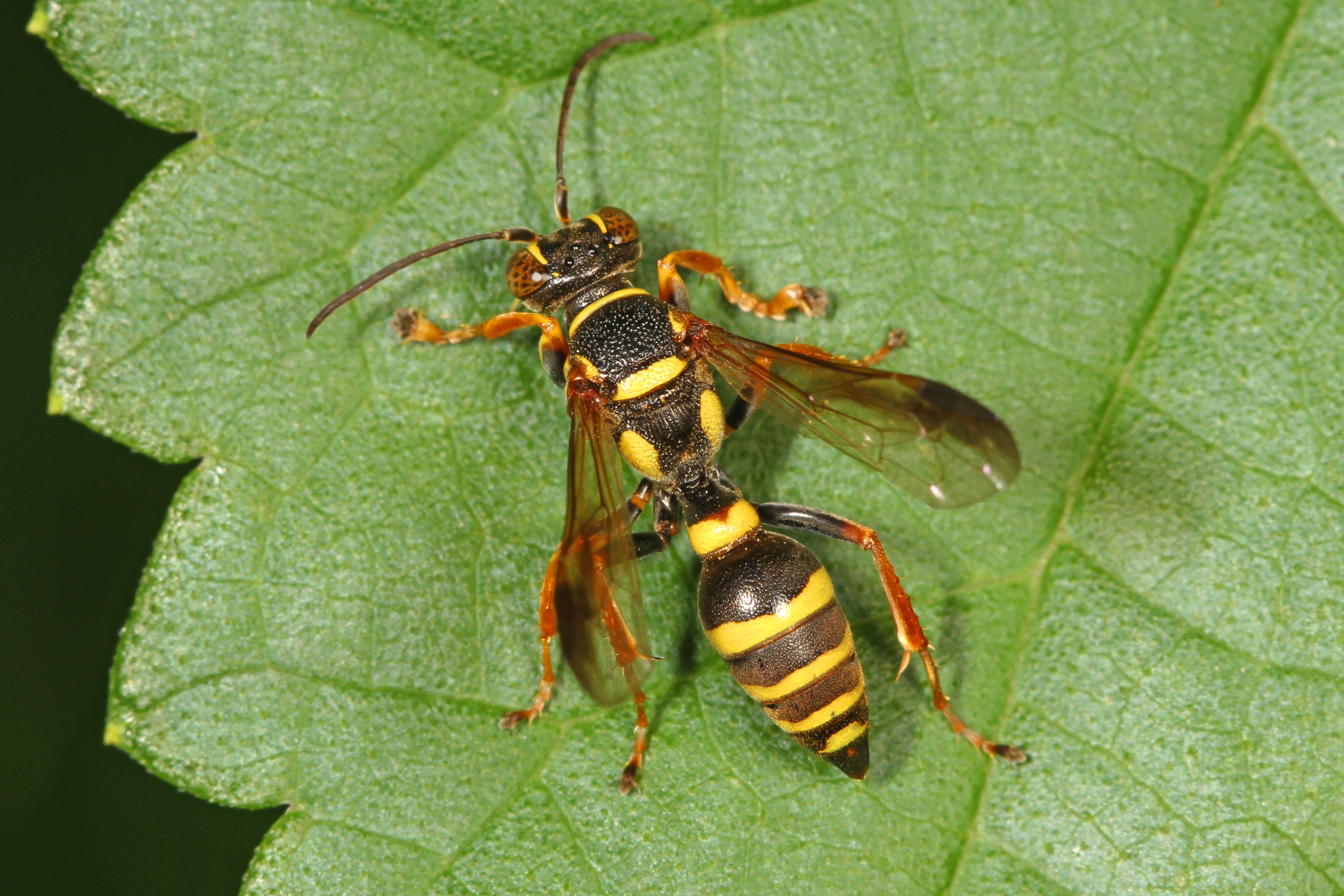

Scientific classification
- Domain: Eukaryota
- Kingdom: Animalia
- Phylum: Arthropoda
- Class: Insecta
- Order: Hymenoptera
- Family: Bembicidae
- Tribe: Bembicini
- Subtribe: Gorytina
- Genus: Psammaletes
- Species: P. mexicanus

Binomial name
- Psammaletes mexicanus (Cameron, 1890)

Synonyms
- Gorytes mexicanus Cameron, 1890; Gorytes pechumani (Pate, 1936); Psammaletes pechumani Pate, 1936

= Psammaletes mexicanus =

Species of wasp

Psammaletes mexicanus is a species of sand wasp in the family Bembicidae. It is found in Central America and North America.
