= Microbembex californica =

Scientific classification
- Domain: Eukaryota
- Kingdom: Animalia
- Phylum: Arthropoda
- Class: Insecta
- Order: Hymenoptera
- Family: Bembicidae
- Tribe: Bembicini
- Subtribe: Bembicina
- Genus: Microbembex
- Species: M. californica

Binomial name
- Microbembex californica R. Bohart, 1970

Species of wasp

Microbembex californica is a species of sand wasp in the family of Bembicidae.
