= Didineis latimana =

Scientific classification
- Domain: Eukaryota
- Kingdom: Animalia
- Phylum: Arthropoda
- Class: Insecta
- Order: Hymenoptera
- Family: Bembicidae
- Tribe: Alyssontini
- Genus: Didineis
- Species: D. latimana

Binomial name
- Didineis latimana Malloch & Rohwer, 1930

Species of wasp

Didineis latimana is a species of wasp in the family Bembicidae. It is found in North America.
