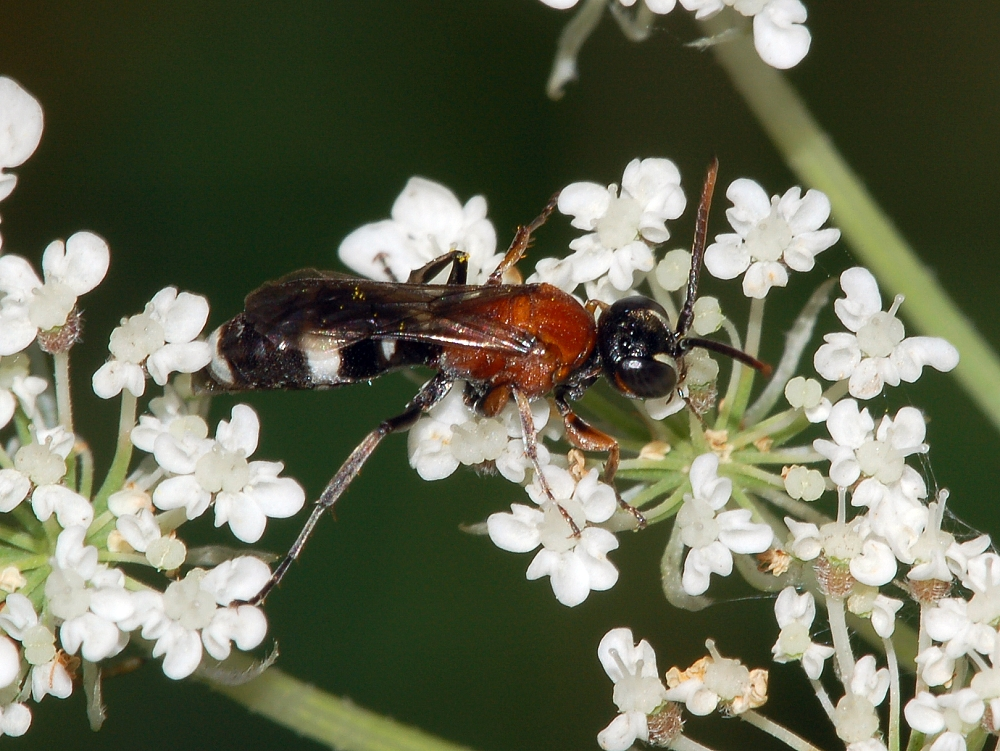
- Harpactus laevis

Scientific classification
- Kingdom: Animalia
- Phylum: Arthropoda
- Class: Insecta
- Order: Hymenoptera
- Family: Bembicidae
- Subfamily: Bembicinae
- Tribe: Bembicini
- Subtribe: Gorytina
- Genus: Harpactus; Shuckard, 1837

Species
- Several, including: Harpactus elegans; Harpactus laevis

= Harpactus =

Genus of wasps

Harpactus is a genus of hunting wasps in the tribe Bembicini.
