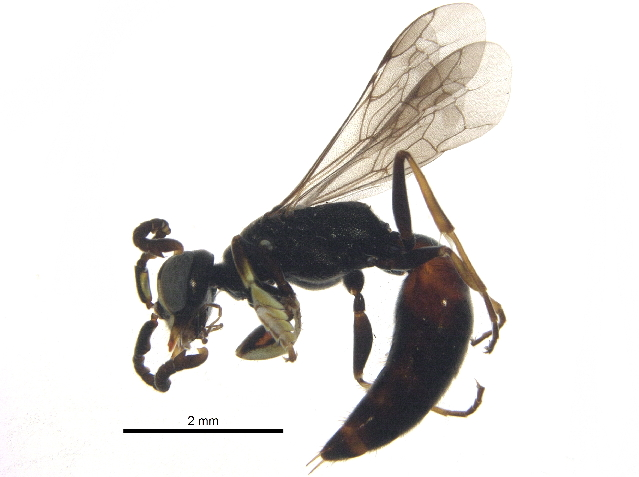

Scientific classification
- Domain: Eukaryota
- Kingdom: Animalia
- Phylum: Arthropoda
- Class: Insecta
- Order: Hymenoptera
- Family: Bembicidae
- Tribe: Alyssontini
- Genus: Didineis
- Species: D. nodosa

Binomial name
- Didineis nodosa W. Fox, 1894

Synonyms
- Didineis clypeata Malloch and Rohwer, 1930; Didineis sanctacrucae Bradley, 1920

= Didineis nodosa =

Species of wasp

Didineis nodosa is a species of wasp in the family Bembicidae. It is found in Central America and North America.

== Subspecies ==
These two subspecies belong to the species Didineis nodosa:

- Didineis nodosa clypeata Malloch & Rohwer
- Didineis nodosa nodosa
