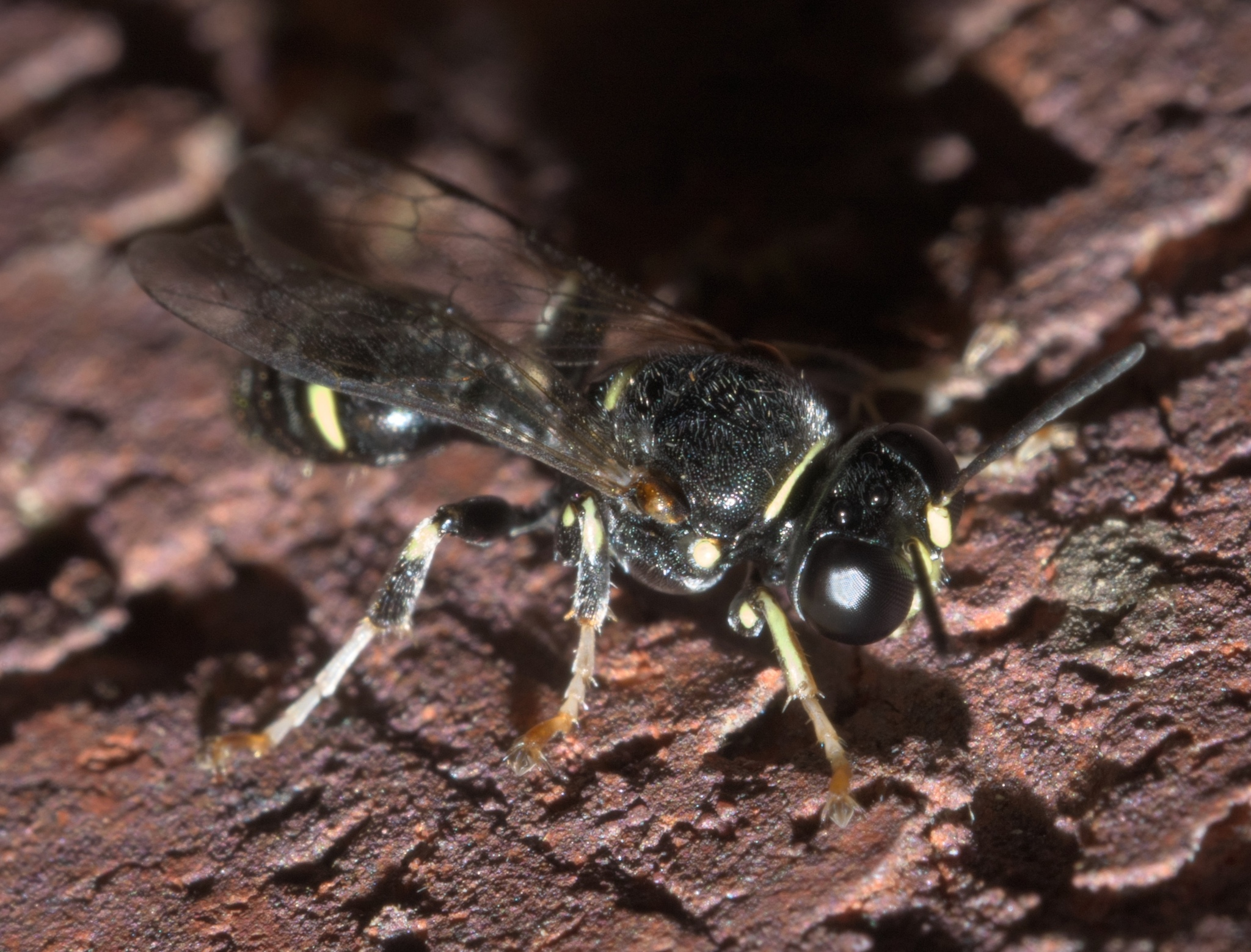
- Clitemnestra bipunctata

Scientific classification
- Domain: Eukaryota
- Kingdom: Animalia
- Phylum: Arthropoda
- Class: Insecta
- Order: Hymenoptera
- Family: Bembicidae
- Subfamily: Bembicinae
- Tribe: Bembicini
- Subtribe: Exeirina
- Genus: Clitemnestra; Spinola, 1851

Synonyms
- Clytemnestra de Saussure, 1867; Miscothyris F. Smith, 1869; Ochleroptera Holmberg, 1903; Paramellinus Rohwer, 1912; Astaurus Rayment, 1955

= Clitemnestra =

Genus of wasps

Clitemnestra is a genus of sand wasps in the family Bembicidae. There are at least 60 described species in Clitemnestra.

== Species ==
These 68 species belong to the genus Clitemnestra:

- Clitemnestra aenea (Handlirsch, 1888)^{i c g}
- Clitemnestra aeroides R. Bohart, 2000^{i c g}
- Clitemnestra albitarsis R. Bohart, 2000^{i c g}
- Clitemnestra antennalis R. Bohart, 2000^{i c g}
- Clitemnestra azurea R. Bohart, 2000^{i c g}
- Clitemnestra bijaguae R. Bohart, 2000^{i c g}
- Clitemnestra bipunctata (Say, 1824)^{i c g b}
- Clitemnestra boliviana R. Bohart, 2000^{i c g}
- Clitemnestra brasilica R. Bohart, 2000^{i c g}
- Clitemnestra caerulea R. Bohart, 2000^{i c g}
- Clitemnestra carinata R. Bohart, 2000^{i c g}
- Clitemnestra championi (Cameron, 1890)^{i c g}
- Clitemnestra chilensis (de Saussure, 1867)^{i c g}
- Clitemnestra chilicola R. Bohart, 2000^{i c g}
- Clitemnestra chrysos R. Bohart, 2000^{i c g}
- Clitemnestra clypearis R. Bohart, 2000^{i c g}
- Clitemnestra colombica R. Bohart, 2000^{i c g}
- Clitemnestra colorata (W. Fox, 1897)^{i c g}
- Clitemnestra cooperi R. Bohart, 2000^{i c g}
- Clitemnestra costaricae R. Bohart, 2000^{i c g}
- Clitemnestra densa R. Bohart, 2000^{i c g}
- Clitemnestra duboulayi (R. Turner, 1908)^{i c g}
- Clitemnestra ecuadorica R. Bohart, 2000^{i c g}
- Clitemnestra egana R. Bohart, 2000^{i c g}
- Clitemnestra fritzi R. Bohart, 2000^{i c g}
- Clitemnestra fulva R. Bohart, 2000^{i c g}
- Clitemnestra gayi (Spinola, 1851)^{i c g}
- Clitemnestra gendeka (Pulawski, 1997)^{i c g}
- Clitemnestra guttatula (R. Turner, 1936)^{i c g}
- Clitemnestra hansoni R. Bohart, 2000^{i c g}
- Clitemnestra hirta (Handlirsch, 1888)^{i c g}
- Clitemnestra irwini R. Bohart, 2000^{i c g}
- Clitemnestra lissa R. Bohart, 2000^{i c g}
- Clitemnestra lucidula (R. Turner, 1908)^{i c g}
- Clitemnestra megalophthalma (Handlirsch, 1895)^{i c g}
- Clitemnestra menkei (Pagliano, 1995)^{i c g}
- Clitemnestra mimetica (Cockerell, 1915)^{i c g}
- Clitemnestra multistrigosa Reed, 1894^{i c g}
- Clitemnestra nigrifrons R. Bohart, 2000^{i c g}
- Clitemnestra nigritula R. Bohart, 2000^{i c g}
- Clitemnestra nigroclypeata (Pulawski, 1997)^{i c g}
- Clitemnestra noumeae (Ohl, 2002)^{i c g}
- Clitemnestra novaguineensis (R. Bohart, 1970)^{i c g}
- Clitemnestra oblita (Holmberg, 1903)^{i c g}
- Clitemnestra obscura (Pulawski, 1997)^{i c g}
- Clitemnestra ocellaris R. Bohart, 2000^{i c g}
- Clitemnestra paraguayana R. Bohart, 2000^{i c g}
- Clitemnestra pecki R. Bohart, 2000^{i c g}
- Clitemnestra pedunculata R. Bohart, 2000^{i c g}
- Clitemnestra perlucida (R. Turner, 1916)^{i c g}
- Clitemnestra plomleyi (R. Turner, 1940)^{i c g}
- Clitemnestra puyo R. Bohart, 2000^{i c g}
- Clitemnestra ruficrus R. Bohart, 2000^{i c g}
- Clitemnestra sanambrosiana (Pérez D'Angello, 1980)^{i g}
- Clitemnestra sanguinolenta (R. Turner, 1908)^{i c g}
- Clitemnestra schlingeri R. Bohart, 2000^{i c g}
- Clitemnestra sensilis R. Bohart, 2000^{i c g}
- Clitemnestra sphaerosoma (Handlirsch, 1895)^{i c g}
- Clitemnestra strigula R. Bohart, 2000^{i c g}
- Clitemnestra tenuicornis (Rayment, 1955)^{i c g}
- Clitemnestra thoracica (F. Smith, 1869)^{i c g}
- Clitemnestra toroi R. Bohart, 2000^{i c g}
- Clitemnestra vallensis R. Bohart, 2000^{i c g}
- Clitemnestra vardyorum R. Bohart, 2000^{i c g}
- Clitemnestra violacea (Handlirsch, 1888)^{i c g}
- Clitemnestra wasbaueri R. Bohart, 2000^{i c g}
- Clitemnestra willinki R. Bohart, 2000^{i c g}
- Clitemnestra zeta R. Bohart, 2000^{i c g}

Data sources: i = ITIS, c = Catalogue of Life, g = GBIF, b = Bugguide.net
