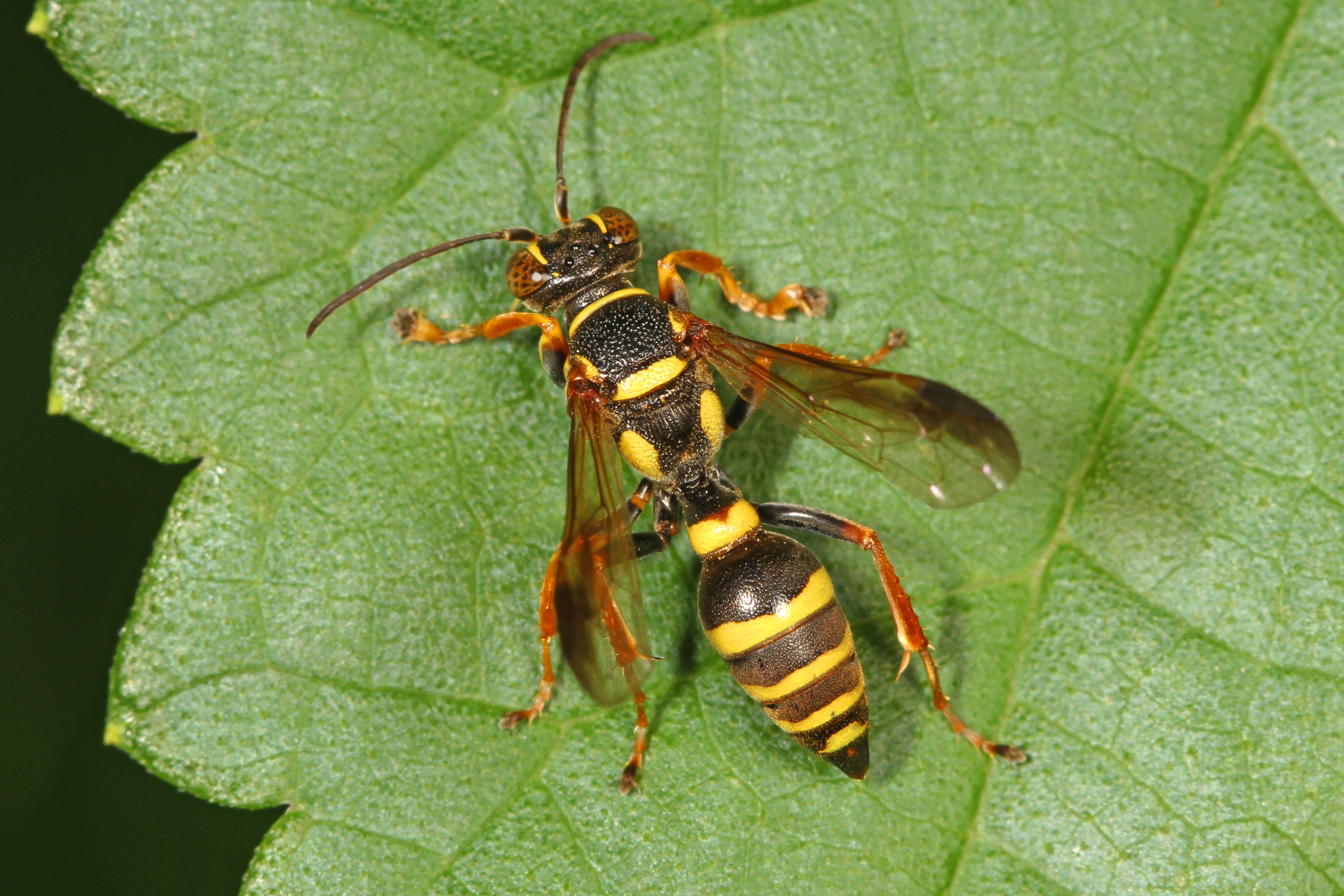
- Psammaletes mexicanus

Scientific classification
- Domain: Eukaryota
- Kingdom: Animalia
- Phylum: Arthropoda
- Class: Insecta
- Order: Hymenoptera
- Family: Bembicidae
- Subfamily: Bembicinae
- Tribe: Bembicini
- Subtribe: Gorytina
- Genus: Psammaletes; Pate, 1936

= Psammaletes =

Genus of wasps

Psammaletes is a genus of sand wasps in the family Bembicidae. There are about nine described species in Psammaletes.

== Species ==
These nine species belong to the genus Psammaletes:

- Psammaletes arizonicus R. Bohart, 2000
- Psammaletes bigeloviae (Cockerell, 1897)
- Psammaletes brasilae R. Bohart, 2000
- Psammaletes costaricae R. Bohart, 2000
- Psammaletes crucis (Cockerell, 1897)
- Psammaletes floridicus R. Bohart, 2000
- Psammaletes hooki R. Bohart, 2000
- Psammaletes mexicanus (Cameron, 1890)
- Psammaletes schlingeri R. Bohart, 2000
