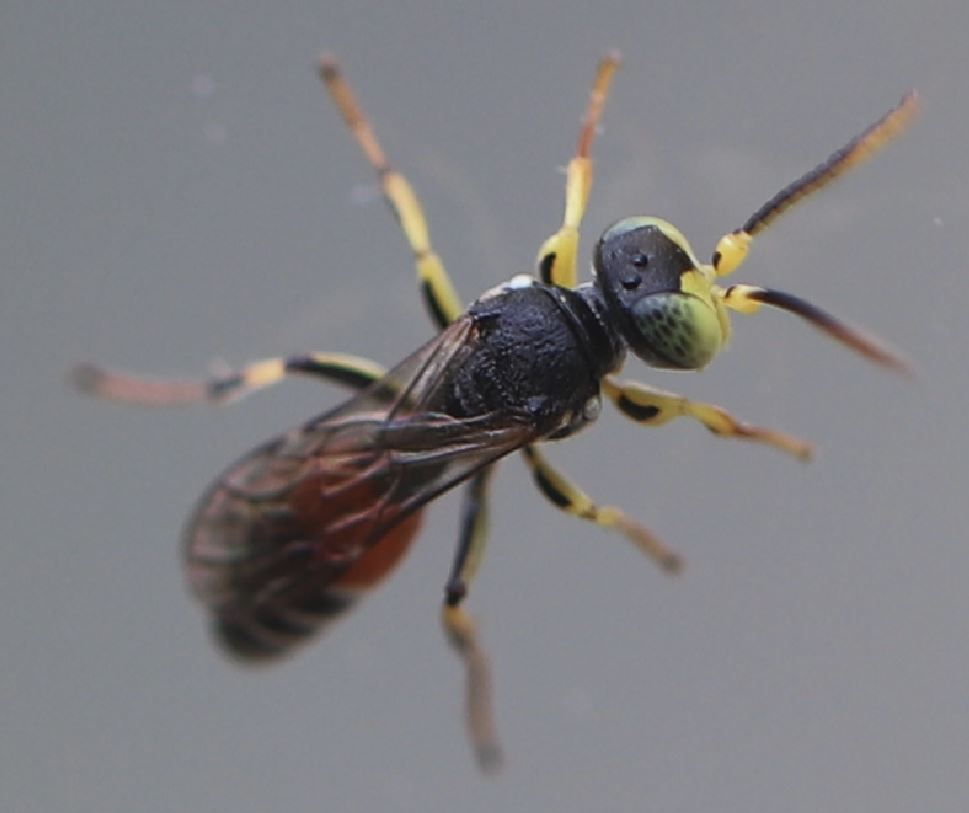

Scientific classification
- Kingdom: Animalia
- Phylum: Arthropoda
- Class: Insecta
- Order: Hymenoptera
- Family: Bembicidae
- Genus: Harpactus
- Species: H. elegans

Binomial name
- Harpactus elegans (Lepeletier, 1832)

Subspecies
- Harpactus elegans elegans; Harpactus elegans siculus

Synonyms
- Arpactus elegans Lepeletier de Saint Fargeau, 1832

= Harpactus elegans =

Species of wasp

Harpactus elegans is a species of hunting wasps in the tribe Bembicini. It is found in Europe.
