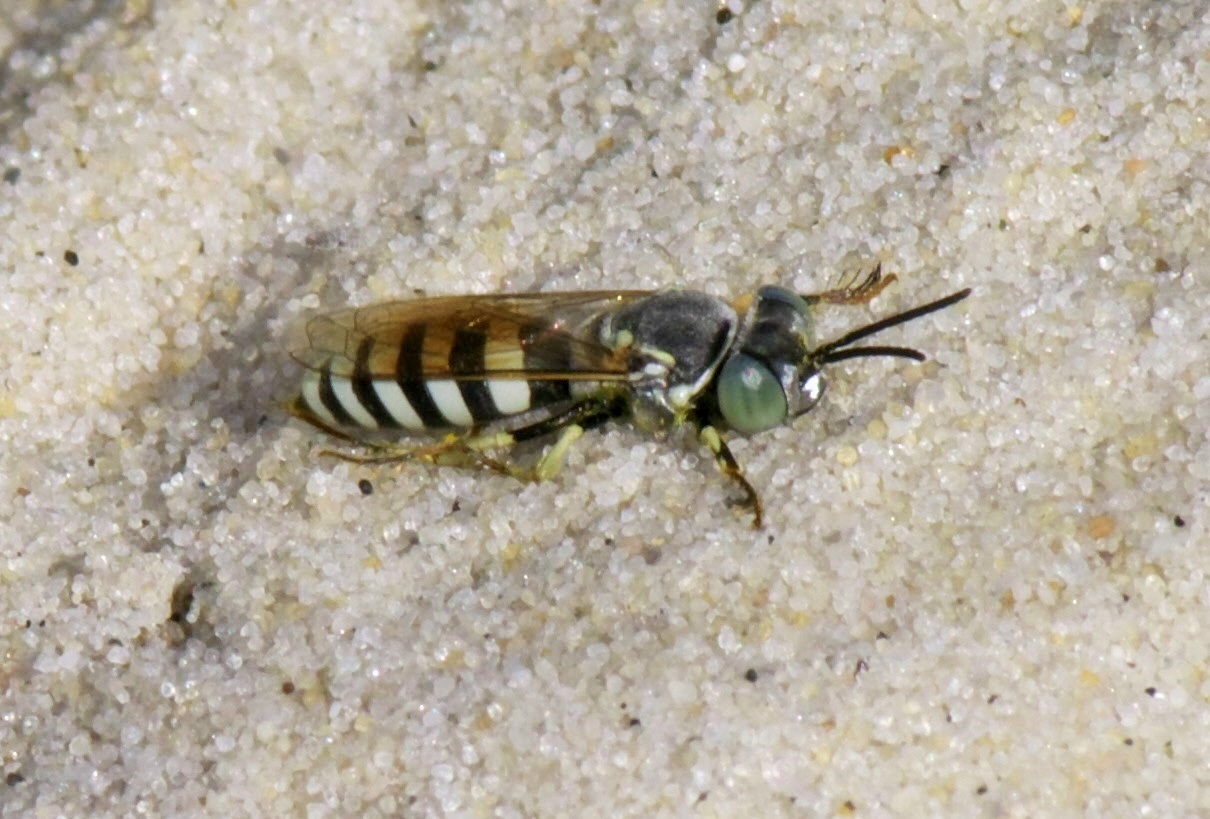
- Microbembex monodonta, Virginia

Scientific classification
- Domain: Eukaryota
- Kingdom: Animalia
- Phylum: Arthropoda
- Class: Insecta
- Order: Hymenoptera
- Family: Bembicidae
- Subfamily: Bembicinae
- Tribe: Bembicini
- Subtribe: Bembicina
- Genus: Microbembex; Patton, 1879

= Microbembex =

Genus of wasps

Microbembex is a genus of sand wasps in the family Bembicidae. There are more than 30 described species in Microbembex.

== Species ==
These 36 species belong to the genus Microbembex:

- Microbembex albivena R. Bohart, 1993
- Microbembex anilis (Handlirsch, 1893)
- Microbembex argentifrons (Cresson, 1865)
- Microbembex argentina Brèthes, 1913
- Microbembex argyropleura R. Bohart, 1970
- Microbembex aurata J. Parker, 1917
- Microbembex australis R. Bohart, 1989
- Microbembex bidens J. Parker, 1929
- Microbembex californica R. Bohart, 1970
- Microbembex catamarcae Willink, 1989
- Microbembex ciliata (Fabricius, 1804)
- Microbembex coxalis R. Bohart, 1993
- Microbembex cubana R. Bohart, 1976
- Microbembex difformis (Handlirsch, 1893)
- Microbembex elegans Griswold, 1996
- Microbembex equalis J. Parker, 1929
- Microbembex evansi R. Bohart, 1993
- Microbembex gratiosa (F. Smith, 1856)
- Microbembex hirsuta J. Parker, 1917
- Microbembex luteipes R. Bohart, 1993
- Microbembex mendozae R. Bohart, 1989
- Microbembex mondonta
- Microbembex monodonta (Say, 1824)
- Microbembex monstrosa Willink, 1989
- Microbembex mosdonta
- Microbembex nasuta J. Parker, 1929
- Microbembex nigrifrons (Provancher, 1888)
- Microbembex patagonica (Brèthes, 1913)
- Microbembex platytarsis R. Bohart, 1989
- Microbembex pygidialis (Handlirsch, 1893)
- Microbembex rufiventris R. Bohart, 1970
- Microbembex sternalis R. Bohart, 1993
- Microbembex subgratiosa (Strand, 1910)
- Microbembex sulphurea (Spinola, 1851)
- Microbembex tricosa J. Parker, 1929
- Microbembex uruguayensis (Holmberg, 1884)
