= Editha =

Scientific classification
- Domain: Eukaryota
- Kingdom: Animalia
- Phylum: Arthropoda
- Class: Insecta
- Order: Hymenoptera
- Family: Bembicidae
- Subtribe: Bembicina
- Genus: Editha; J. Parker, 1929

Species
- Editha adonis Editha caesarea Editha diana Editha fuscipennis Editha integra Editha magnifica Editha pulcherrima

Genus of wasps

Editha is a small genus of large, brightly colored sand wasps, restricted to South America. They are specialized predators of butterflies, and after capturing and paralyzing their prey, they strip the wings off before placing the bodies in an underground cell to serve as food for the wasp larva.
