= Tiguipa =

Tiguipa may refer to:

- Tiguipa (wasp), a genus of wasps in the family Crabronidae
- Tigüipa, a town in Bolivia
  - Tiguipa Airport
