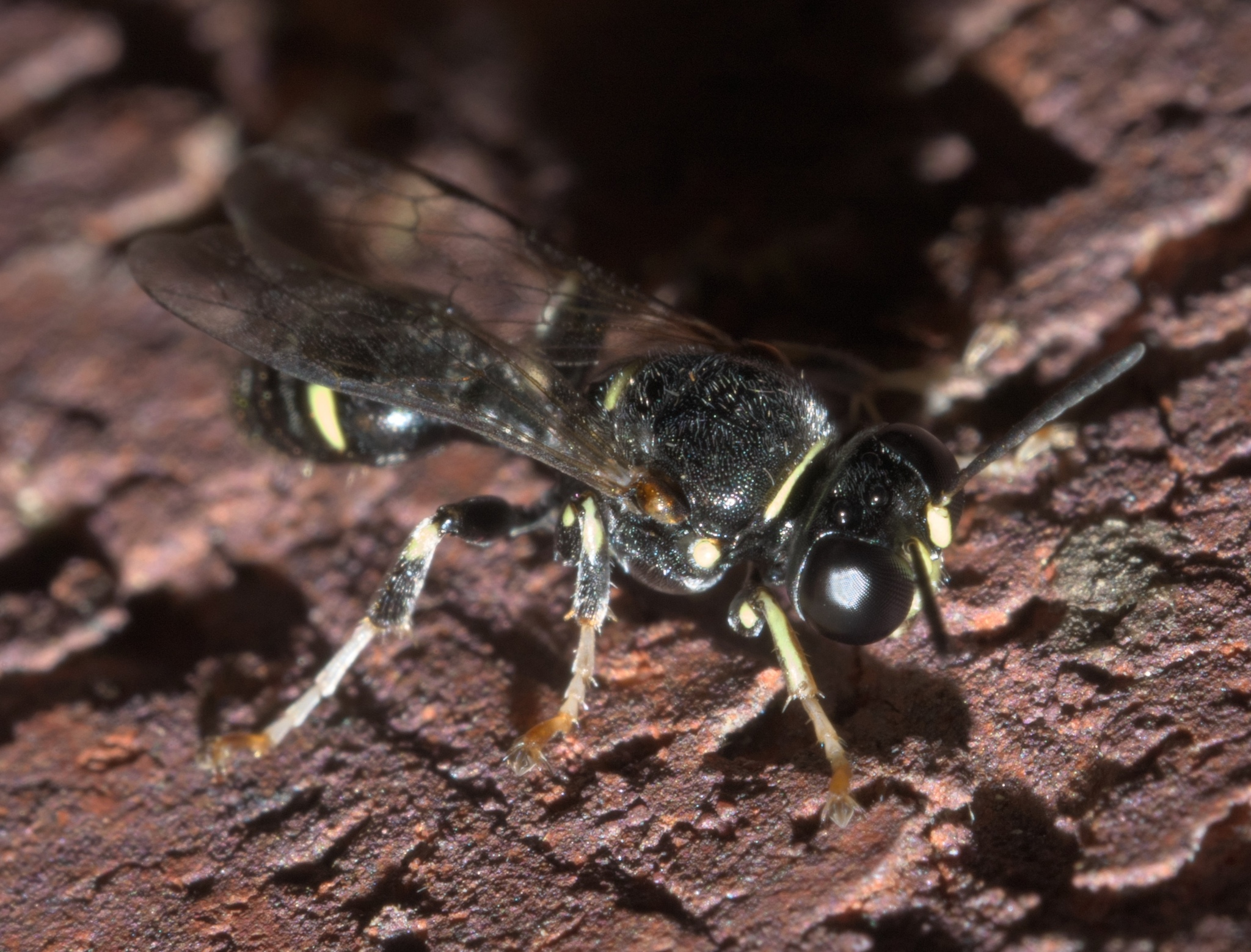
- Clitemnestra bipunctata, Oklahoma

Scientific classification
- Domain: Eukaryota
- Kingdom: Animalia
- Phylum: Arthropoda
- Class: Insecta
- Order: Hymenoptera
- Family: Bembicidae
- Genus: Clitemnestra
- Species: C. bipunctata

Binomial name
- Clitemnestra bipunctata (Say, 1824)

Synonyms
- Gorytes bipunctatus Say, 1824; Ochleroptera jamaica Pate, 1947

= Clitemnestra bipunctata =

Species of wasp

Clitemnestra bipunctata is a species of sand wasp in the family Bembicidae. It is found in Central America and North America.
