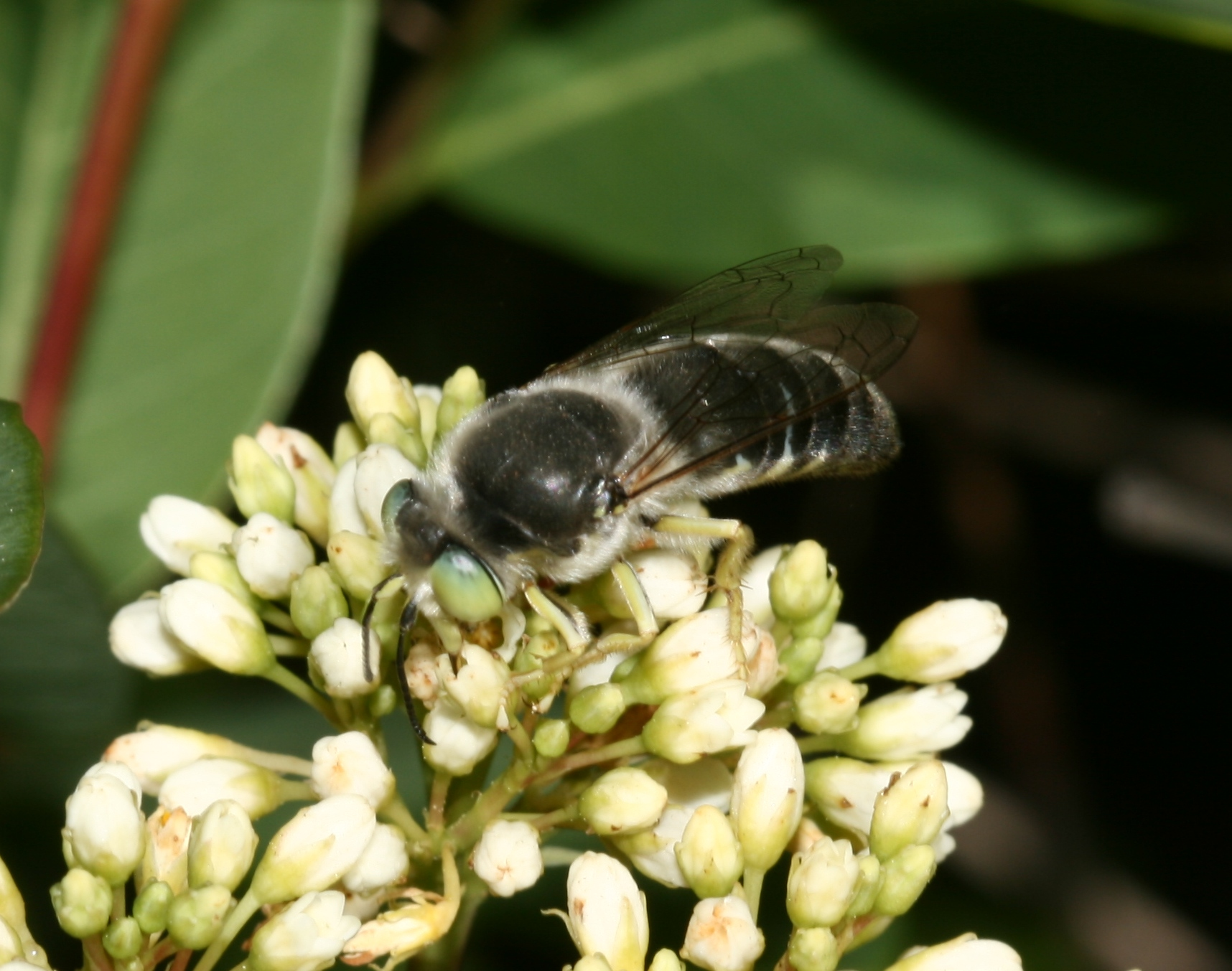

Scientific classification
- Domain: Eukaryota
- Kingdom: Animalia
- Phylum: Arthropoda
- Class: Insecta
- Order: Hymenoptera
- Family: Bembicidae
- Tribe: Bembicini
- Subtribe: Bembicina
- Genus: Bembix
- Species: B. amoena

Binomial name
- Bembix amoena Handlirsch, 1893

= Bembix amoena =

Species of wasp

Bembix amoena is a species of sand wasp in the family Bembicidae. It is found in North America.
