= Steniolia scolopacea =

Scientific classification
- Domain: Eukaryota
- Kingdom: Animalia
- Phylum: Arthropoda
- Class: Insecta
- Order: Hymenoptera
- Family: Bembicidae
- Genus: Steniolia
- Species: S. scolopacea

Binomial name
- Steniolia scolopacea Handlirsch, 1889

Species of wasp

Steniolia scolopacea is a species of sand wasp in the family Bembicidae. It is found in Central America and North America.

== Subspecies ==
- Steniolia scolopacea albicantia J. Parker, 1917
- Steniolia scolopacea scolopacea Handlirsch, 1889
