= Bembix occidentalis =

Scientific classification
- Domain: Eukaryota
- Kingdom: Animalia
- Phylum: Arthropoda
- Class: Insecta
- Order: Hymenoptera
- Family: Bembicidae
- Tribe: Bembicini
- Subtribe: Bembicina
- Genus: Bembix
- Species: B. occidentalis

Binomial name
- Bembix occidentalis W. Fox, 1893

Synonyms
- Bembex obsoleta Howard, 1901; Bembix beutenmulleri W. Fox, 1901; Bembix occidentalis beutenmuelleri W. Fox, 1901; Epibembex occidentalis beutenmuelleri (W. Fox, 1901)

Species of wasp

Bembix occidentalis is a species of sand wasp in the family Bembicidae. It is found in Central America and North America.
