= Therapon =

Therapon may refer to:

- Deprecated name for Zyzzyx, a genus of wasps
- unjustified emendation for Terapon, a genus of fishes
