= Didineis =

- Didineis texana

Scientific classification
- Kingdom: Animalia
- Phylum: Arthropoda
- Clade: Pancrustacea
- Class: Insecta
- Order: Hymenoptera
- Family: Bembicidae
- Subfamily: Nyssoninae
- Tribe: Alyssontini
- Genus: Didineis; Wesmael, 1852

Genus of wasps

Didineis is a genus of wasps in the family Bembicidae. There are more than 20 described species in the genus Didineis.

== Species ==
- Didineis aculeata (Cresson, 1865)
- Didineis bactriana Gussakovskij, 1937
- Didineis barbieri (de Beaumont, 1968)
- Didineis botsharnikovi Gussakovskij, 1937
- Didineis bucharica Gussakovskij, 1937
- Didineis clavimana Gussakovskij, 1937
- Didineis crassicornis Handlirsch, 1888
- Didineis dilata Malloch & Rohwer, 1930
- Didineis hispanica Guichard, 1990
- Didineis latimana Malloch & Rohwer, 1930
- Didineis latro (de Beaumont, 1967)
- Didineis lunicornis (Fabricius, 1798)
- Didineis massaica Pulawski, 2000
- Didineis nigricans Morice, 1911
- Didineis nodosa W. Fox, 1894
- Didineis orientalis Cameron, 1897
- Didineis pannonica Handlirsch, 1888
- Didineis peculiaris W. Fox, 1894
- Didineis sibirica Gussakovskij, 1937
- Didineis stevensi Rohwer, 1923
- Didineis texana (Cresson, 1873)
- Didineis vierecki Rohwer, 1911
- Didineis wuestneii Handlirsch, 1888
