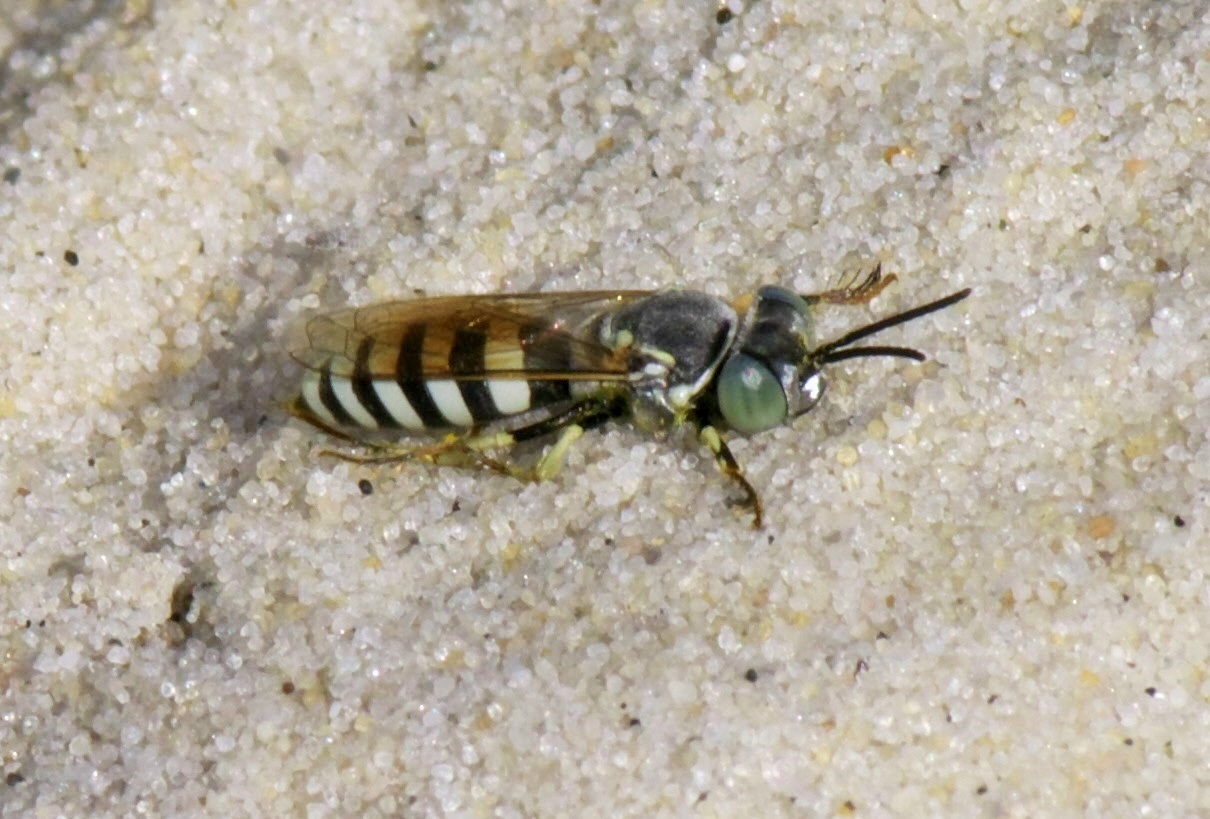

Scientific classification
- Domain: Eukaryota
- Kingdom: Animalia
- Phylum: Arthropoda
- Class: Insecta
- Order: Hymenoptera
- Family: Bembicidae
- Genus: Microbembex
- Species: M. monodonta

Binomial name
- Microbembex monodonta (Say, 1824)

Synonyms
- Bembex monodonta Say, 1824; Microbembex monodonta occidentalis Johnson and Rohwer, 1908; Microbembex tarsalis Rohwer, 1914

= Microbembex monodonta =

Species of wasp

Microbembex monodonta is a species of sand wasp in the family Bembicidae. It is found in the Caribbean Sea, Central America, North America, and South America.
