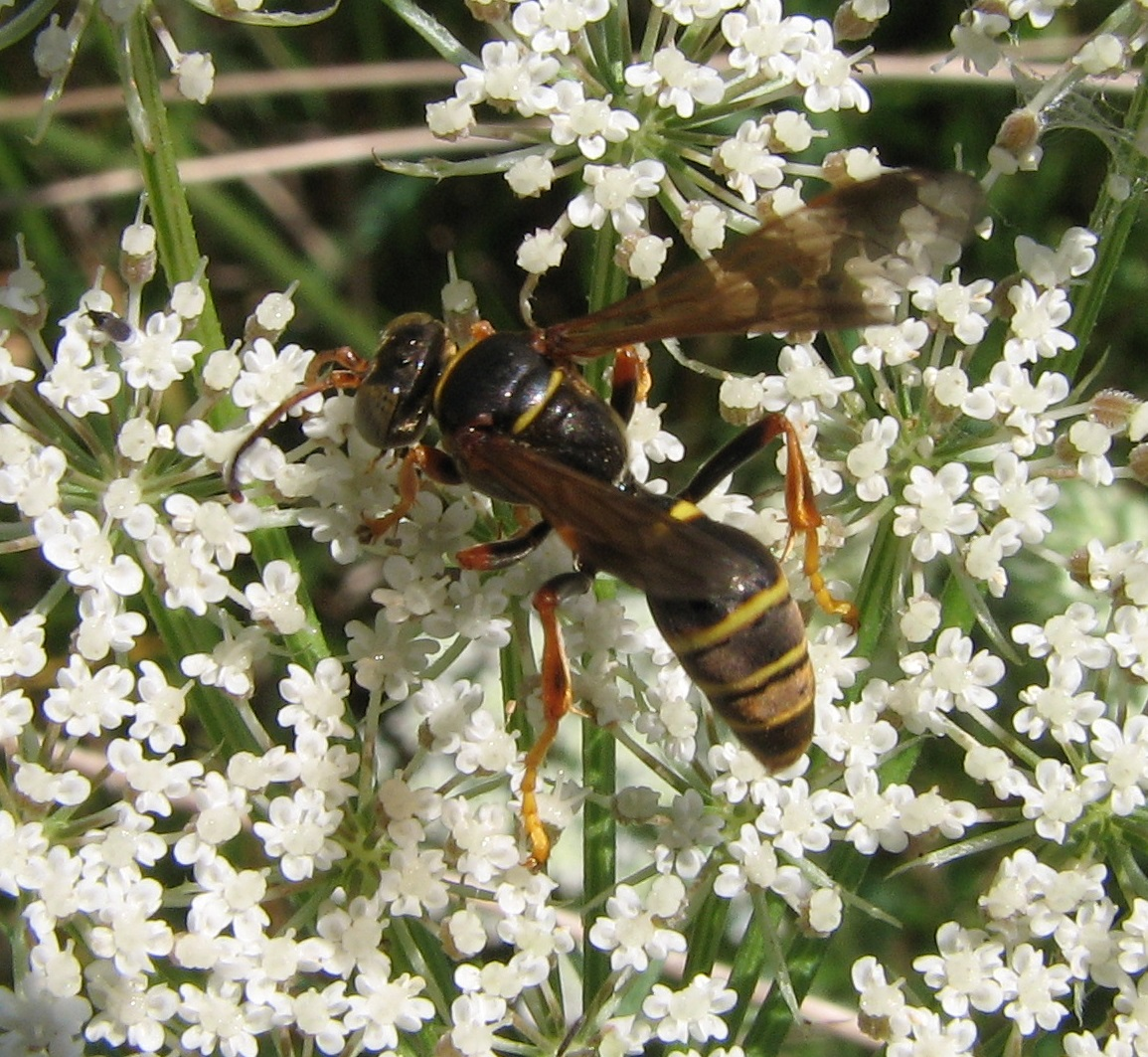
- Saygorytes phaleratus

Scientific classification
- Kingdom: Animalia
- Phylum: Arthropoda
- Class: Insecta
- Order: Hymenoptera
- Family: Bembicidae
- Subtribe: Gorytina
- Genus: Saygorytes; Nemkov, 2007

= Saygorytes =

Genus of wasps

Saygorytes is a genus of sand wasps in the family Bembicidae. There are about seven described species in Saygorytes.

== Species ==
These seven species belong to the genus Saygorytes:

- Saygorytes apicalis (F. Smith, 1856)
- Saygorytes guadalajarae (R. Bohart, 1969)
- Saygorytes notipilis (R. Bohart, 1969)
- Saygorytes oraclensis (R. Bohart, 1969)
- Saygorytes phaleratus (Say, 1837)
- Saygorytes tritospilus (R. Bohart, 1969)
- Saygorytes werneri (R. Bohart, 1969)
