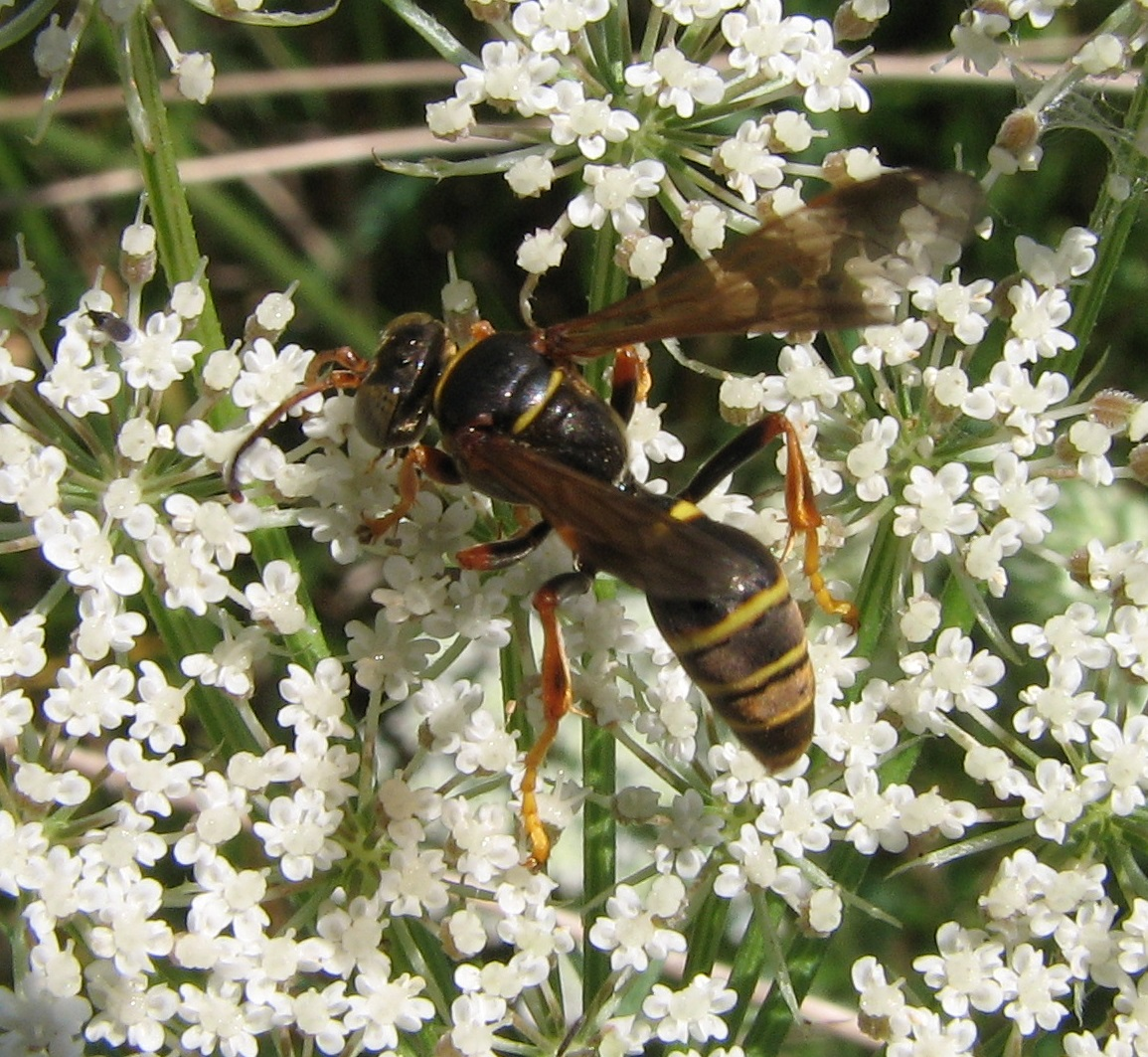

Scientific classification
- Kingdom: Animalia
- Phylum: Arthropoda
- Class: Insecta
- Order: Hymenoptera
- Family: Bembicidae
- Genus: Saygorytes
- Species: S. phaleratus

Binomial name
- Saygorytes phaleratus (Say, 1837)

Synonyms
- Gorytes alpestris Cameron, 1890; Gorytes alticola Cameron, 1890; Gorytes flavicornis Packard, 1867; Gorytes fulvipennis F. Smith, 1856; Gorytes modestus Cresson, 1865; Gorytes papagorum Viereck, 1908; Gorytes phaleratus Say, 1837; Gorytes rufoluteus Packard, 1867; Gorytes subaustralis Viereck, 1908; Hoplisus flavicornis (Packard, 1867); Hoplisus fulvipennis (F. Smith, 1856); Hoplisus modestus (Cresson, 1865); Pseudoplisus alpestris (Cameron, 1890); Pseudoplisus alticola (Cameron, 1890); Pseudoplisus fulvipennis (F. Smith, 1856)

= Saygorytes phaleratus =

Species of wasp

Saygorytes phaleratus is a species of sand wasp in the family Bembicidae. It is found in Central America and North America.
