= Stictiellina =

Scientific classification
- Domain: Eukaryota
- Kingdom: Animalia
- Phylum: Arthropoda
- Class: Insecta
- Order: Hymenoptera
- Family: Bembicidae
- Subfamily: Bembicinae
- Tribe: Bembicini
- Subtribe: Stictiellina; R. Bohart and Horning, 1971

Subtribe of insects

Stictiellina is a subtribe of wasps in the family Bembicidae. There are at least 60 described species in Stictiellina.

== Genera ==
- Chilostictia Gillaspy, 1983
- Glenostictia Gillaspy, 1962
- Microstictia Gillaspy, 1963
- Steniolia Say, 1837
- Stictiella J. Parker, 1917
- Xerostictia Gillaspy, 1963
