= Tiguipa (wasp) =

Scientific classification
- Domain: Eukaryota
- Kingdom: Animalia
- Phylum: Arthropoda
- Class: Insecta
- Order: Hymenoptera
- Family: Bembicidae
- Tribe: Heliocausini
- Genus: Tiguipa; Fritz & Toro, 1976

Genus of wasps

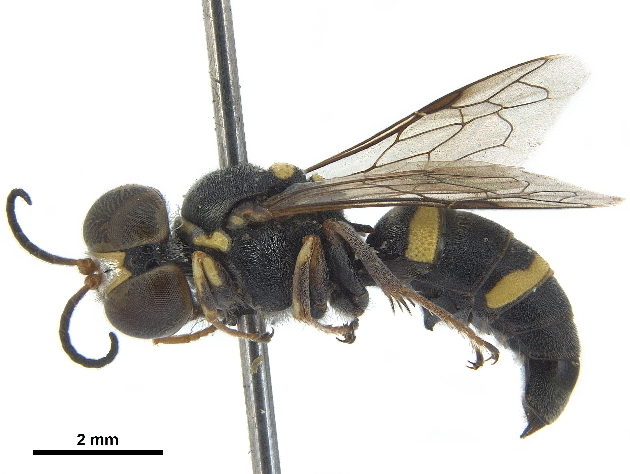
Tiguipa argentina

Tiguipa is a genus of wasps belonging to the family Bembicidae.

The species of this genus are found in South America.

Species:

- Tiguipa argentina (Brèthes)
- Tiguipa fiebrigi (Brèthes, 1909)
