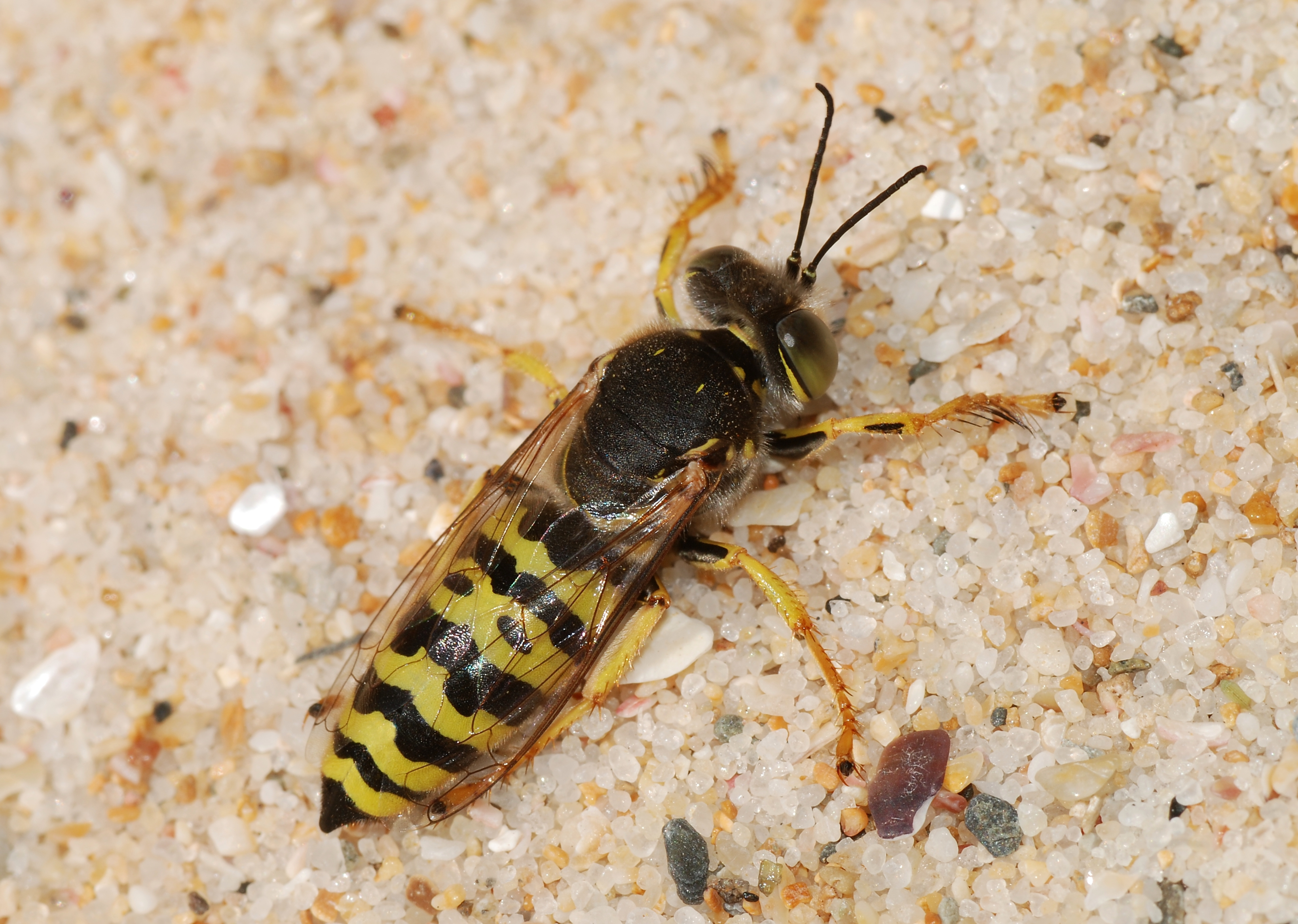
- Bembix oculata

Scientific classification
- Kingdom: Animalia
- Phylum: Arthropoda
- Clade: Pancrustacea
- Class: Insecta
- Order: Hymenoptera
- Family: Bembicidae
- Subfamily: Bembicinae
- Tribe: Bembicini
- Subtribe: Bembicina
- Genus: Bembix; Fabricius, 1775

Type species
- Bembix rostrata (Linnaeus, 1758)

Species
- Bembix rostrata; Bembix tarsata; over 350 more species; see text

= Bembix =

Genus of wasps

Bembix is a large cosmopolitan genus of large, often brightly colored predatory sand wasps, consisting of about 380 species.

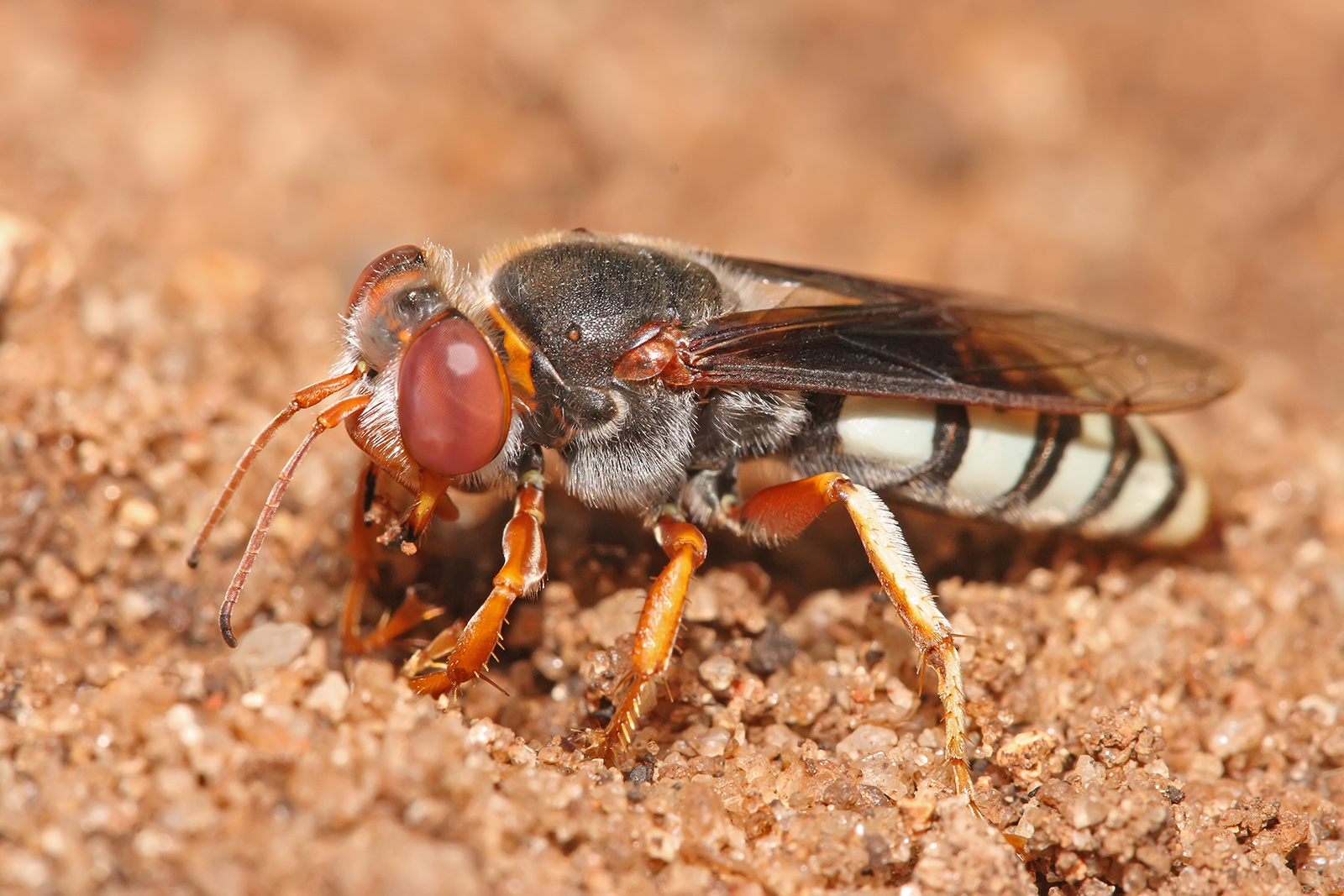
Sand wasp in its habitat, Dar es Salaam, Tanzania

Bembix oculata female at her nest

== List of species (Europe) ==
- Bembix bicolor Radoszkowski 1877
- Bembix bidentata Vander Linden 1829
- Bembix cinctella Handlirsch 1893
- Bembix flavescens F. Smith 1856
- Bembix geneana A. Costa 1867
- Bembix megerlei Dahlbom 1845
- Bembix merceti J. Parker 1904
- Bembix oculata Panzer 1801
- Bembix olivacea Fabricius 1787
- Bembix pallida Radoszkowski 1877
- Bembix rostrata (Linnaeus 1758)
- Bembix sinuata Panzer 1804
- Bembix tarsata Latreille 1809
- Bembix turca Dahlbom 1845
- Bembix wagleri Gistel 1857
- Bembix zonata Klug 1835

== List of species (America) ==
- Bembix americana
- Bembix amoena
- Bembix occidentalis
- Bembix sayi
- Bembix texana

== See also ==
- List of Bembix species
- Bembix musca (Handlirsch 1894) is an Australian native species that is a predator of the native bee, Tetragonula carbonaria
