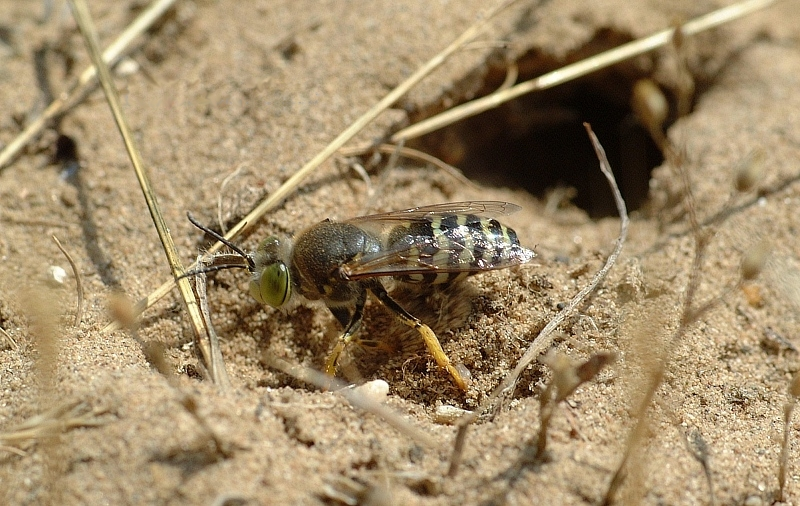

Scientific classification
- Kingdom: Animalia
- Phylum: Arthropoda
- Clade: Pancrustacea
- Class: Insecta
- Order: Hymenoptera
- Family: Bembicidae
- Genus: Bembix
- Species: B. rostrata

Binomial name
- Bembix rostrata (Linnaeus, 1758)

Synonyms
- Apis rostrata Linnaeus, 1758; Bembex dissecta Dahlbom, 1845; Bembex gallica Mocsáry, 1883; Bembex paradoxa Giner Marí, 1943; Bembex rostrata (Linnaeus, 1758); Bembex tarsata (Giner Marí, 1943); Bembex vidua Lepeletier 1845; Epibembex rostrata (Linnaeus, 1758); Vespa armata Sulzer, 1776

= Bembix rostrata =

Species of wasp

Bembix rostrata is a species of sand wasp native to Central Europe. The genus Bembix - of which B. rostrata is among the most distinctive species - has over 340 species worldwide and is found mostly in warm regions with open, sandy soils; Australia and Africa have a particularly rich variety of species.

== Distribution ==
Bembix rostrata ranges in distribution from Europe and the Mediterranean to Central Asia, and as far north as Denmark and Sweden.

== Characteristics ==
Bembix rostrata displays distinctive behaviour in front of its nest, digging its burrows with fast, synchronised movements of its forelegs. In addition, the insect can turn very rapidly about its own axis, the flapping of its wings as it does this producing a buzzing sound reminiscent of a gyroscope. Its size (15–24 mm or 0.59–0.94 in), striking yellow and black-striped abdomen and the labrum, extended into a narrow beak, are distinctive features.

== Life History ==
Bembix rostrata goes through 4 general life stages: egg, larva, pupa, and adult. Adult females burrow nests into the sand and lay their eggs there. Once the eggs hatch, the new larvae continue their development in the nests that they were born in. Each individual grub develops in its own burrow, this reduces competition for development space and necessary nutrients. Adult B. rostrata gather prey and bring the food back for the developing grubs to feed on. When the young reach the pupal stage, females dig another nest to lay more eggs.

== Behaviour ==
Bembix rostrata forms colonies between a dozen and several hundred insects, where the females each construct a tube up to 20 cm (7.9 in) long containing a single brood cell. This is stocked with dozens of insects, predominantly large flies (Tabanidae, Syrphidae), which provide the larva with food for its two-week development to the imago stage. The female carefully re-seals the nest tube after each feeding. Because of this intensive maternal care, a female can raise at most only eight larvae during the high summer. B. rostata is very faithful to its nest sites, often nesting in the same places year-on-year, even if these change over time and alternative habitats are available.

The species has become rare due to loss of large open-sand surfaces in warm areas, such as in the sand dunes of the upper Rhine Graben. It is also the host for several parasitoids in families such as Bombyliidae, Conopidae, and Mutillidae. A cuckoo wasp which specialises in B. rostrata is Parnopes grandior.

The behaviour of B. rostrata led the famous naturalist Jean-Henri Fabre to conduct intensive studies of the species.

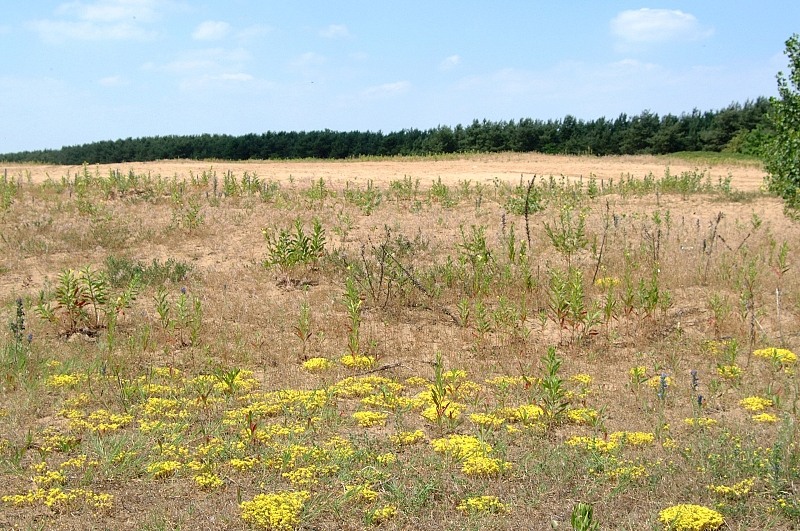
A sand dune near Darmstadt, in the Rhine Graben: open sandy areas like this are the typical habitat for B. rostrata.
