= Bembix sayi =

Scientific classification
- Domain: Eukaryota
- Kingdom: Animalia
- Phylum: Arthropoda
- Class: Insecta
- Order: Hymenoptera
- Family: Bembicidae
- Genus: Bembix
- Species: B. sayi

Binomial name
- Bembix sayi Cresson, 1865

Synonyms
- Bembix latifrons J. Parker, 1917; Epibembex latifrons (J. Parker, 1917)

Species of wasp

Bembix sayi is a species of sand wasp in the family Bembicidae. It is found in Central America and North America.
