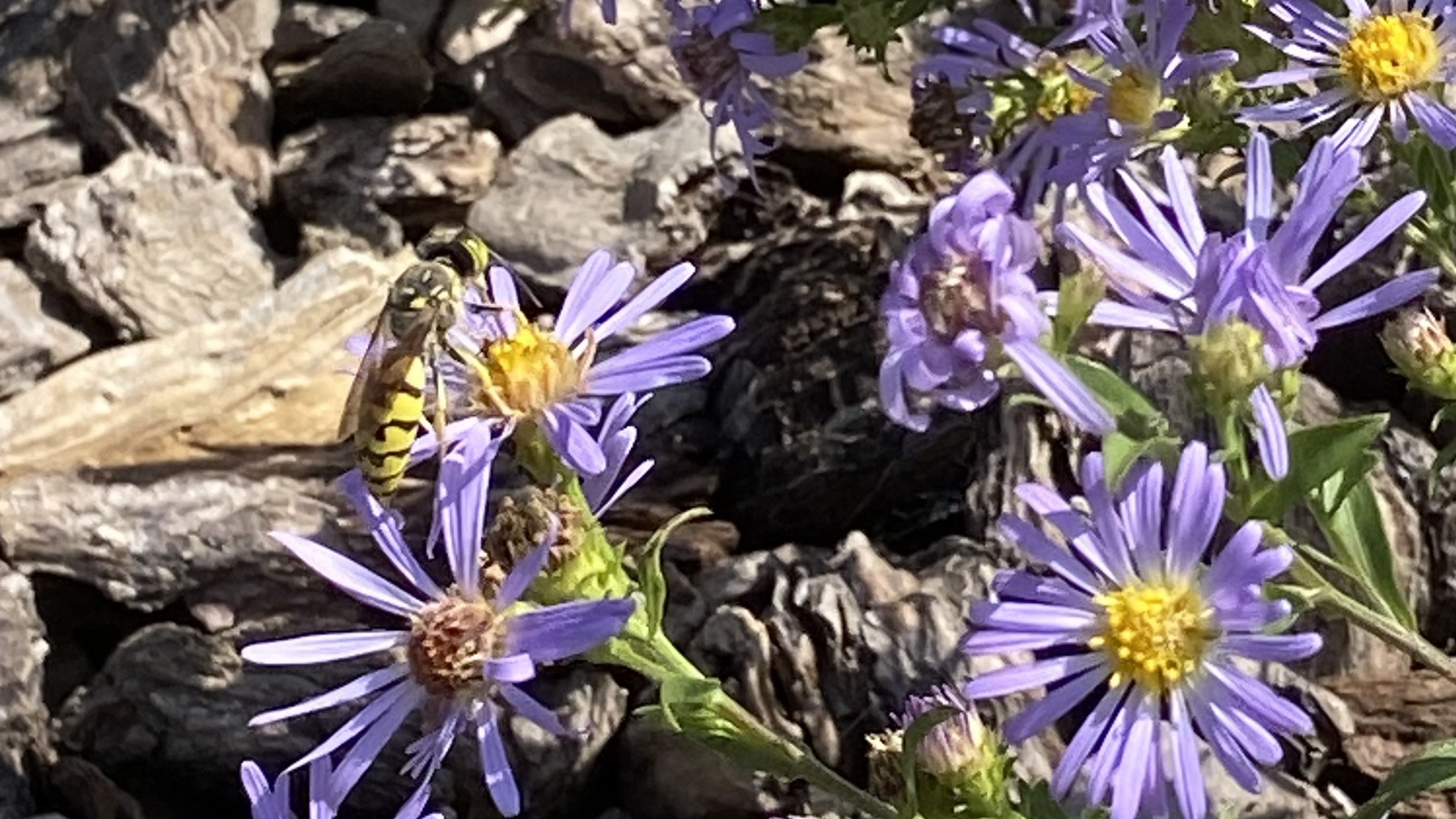

Scientific classification
- Domain: Eukaryota
- Kingdom: Animalia
- Phylum: Arthropoda
- Class: Insecta
- Order: Hymenoptera
- Family: Bembicidae
- Subtribe: Stictiellina
- Genus: Steniolia; Say, 1837

= Steniolia =

Genus of wasps

Steniolia is a genus of sand wasps in the family Bembicidae. There are about 15 described species in Steniolia.

== Species ==
- Steniolia californiensis Gillaspy, 1964
- Steniolia dissimilis C. Fox, 1923
- Steniolia duplicata Provancher, 1888
- Steniolia elegans J. Parker, 1929
- Steniolia eremica Gillaspy, 1964
- Steniolia guatemalensis (Rohwer, 1914)
- Steniolia longirostra (Say, 1837)
- Steniolia mexicana Gillaspy, 1964
- Steniolia nigripes J. Parker, 1917
- Steniolia obliqua (Cresson, 1865)
- Steniolia powelli Gillaspy, 1964
- Steniolia scolopacea Handlirsch, 1889
- Steniolia sulfurea W. Fox, 1901
- Steniolia tibialis Handlirsch, 1889
- Steniolia vanduzeei Gillaspy, 1964
