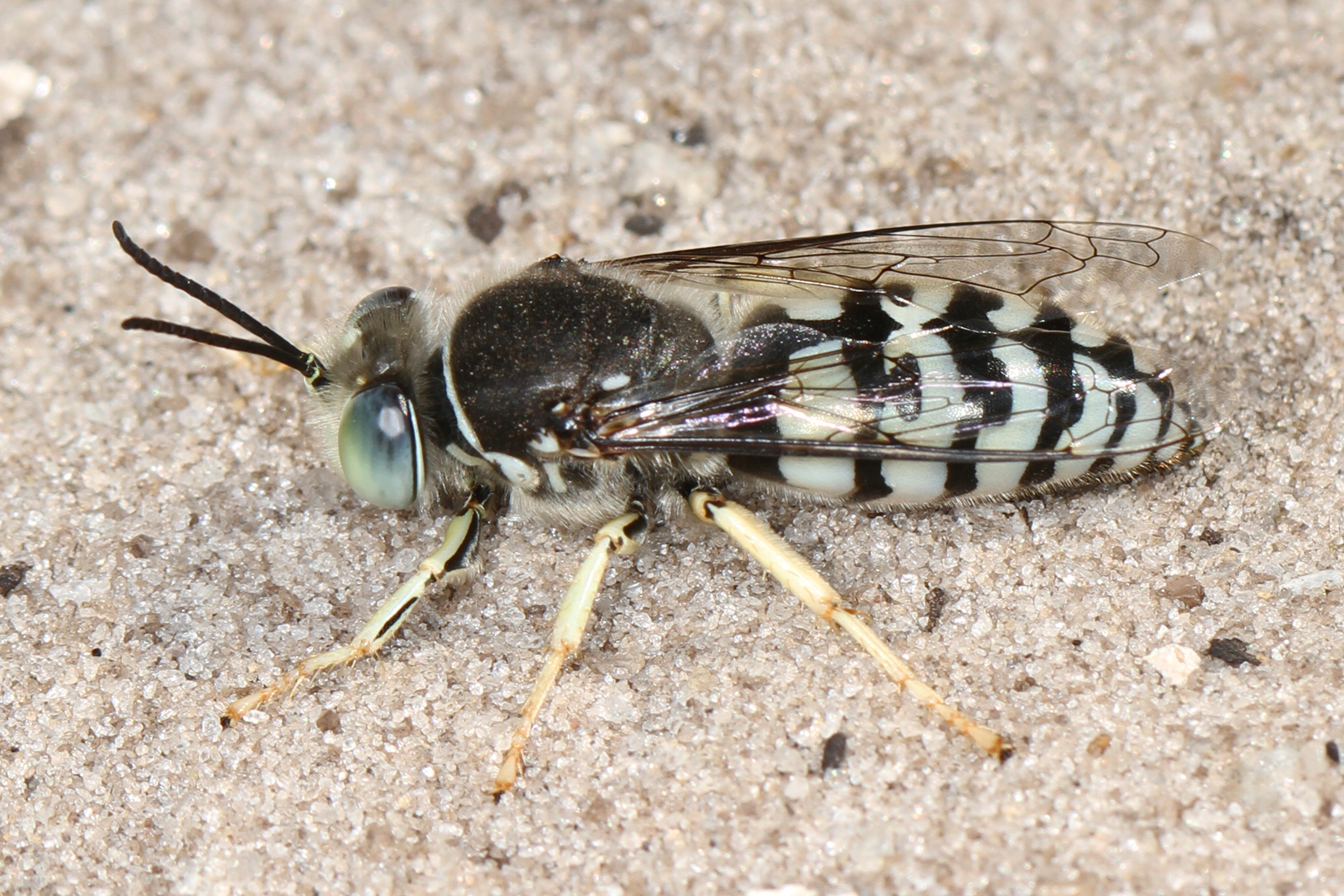

Scientific classification
- Domain: Eukaryota
- Kingdom: Animalia
- Phylum: Arthropoda
- Class: Insecta
- Order: Hymenoptera
- Family: Bembicidae
- Genus: Bembix
- Species: B. texana

Binomial name
- Bembix texana Cresson, 1873

= Bembix texana =

Species of wasp

Bembix texana is a species of sand wasp in the family Bembicidae. It is found in North America.
