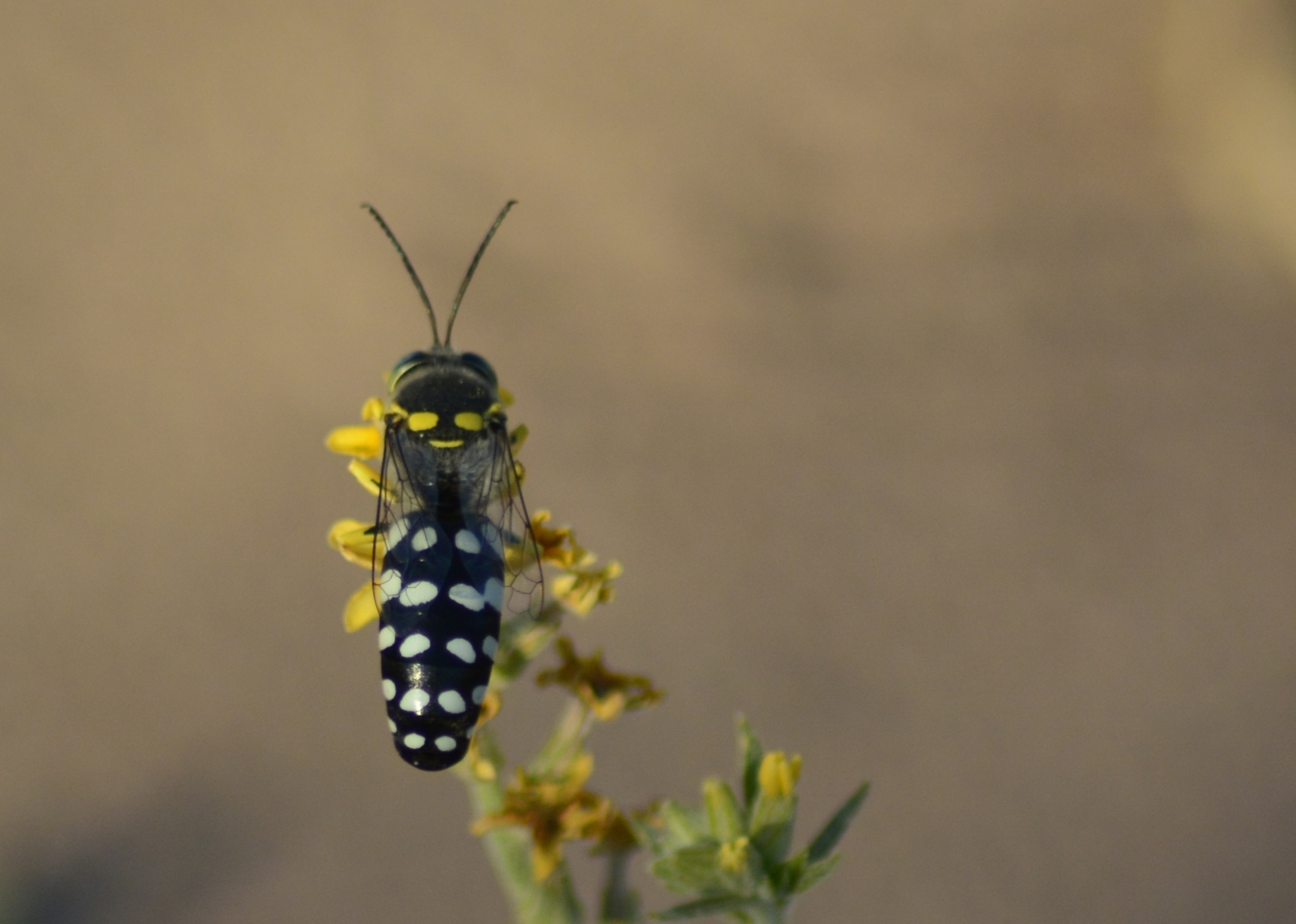
- Z. chilensis observed in Argentina

Scientific classification
- Domain: Eukaryota
- Kingdom: Animalia
- Phylum: Arthropoda
- Class: Insecta
- Order: Hymenoptera
- Family: Bembicidae
- Subtribe: Bembicina
- Genus: Zyzzyx; Pate, 1937

Type species
- Stictia chilensis Eschscholz, 1822

Species
- Zyzzyx chilensis (Eschscholz, 1822)

Synonyms
- Genus: Therapon Parker, 1929; Species: Stictia chilensis Eschscholz, 1822; Bembex peruviana Guérin-Méneville, 1835; Monedula orbignyi Guérin-Méneville, 1844; Monedula odontomera Handlirsch, 1890

= Zyzzyx =

Species of insect

Zyzzyx is a monospecific genus of sand wasp, containing a brightly coloured, medium-sized species, Zyzzyx chilensis. It is primarily a predator on flies, but has been observed to consume skippers. "Zyzzyx" is a replacement name proposed in 1937 by V. S. L. Pate for Therapon, originally described by J. Parker in 1929.

Z. chilensis is found in Chile, Peru, and Argentina.
