= Heliocausini =

Scientific classification
- Kingdom: Animalia
- Phylum: Arthropoda
- Clade: Pancrustacea
- Class: Insecta
- Order: Hymenoptera
- Family: Bembicidae
- Subfamily: Bembicinae
- Tribe: Heliocausini

Genera
- Acanthocausus; Heliocausus; Tiguipa

Tribe of wasps

Heliocausini is a tribe of bembicid wasps endemic to South America, with a peak of species richness in arid central Argentina. The heliocausine wasps are notable for their marked and unusual sexual dimorphism. Males are larger than females (males are smaller than females in most insects), with very large eyes and with a number of bizarre metasomal modifications.

== Behaviour ==
In some places it is common to find heliocausine males performing territorial displays which consist of fast take-offs, low-level flying and landings.
