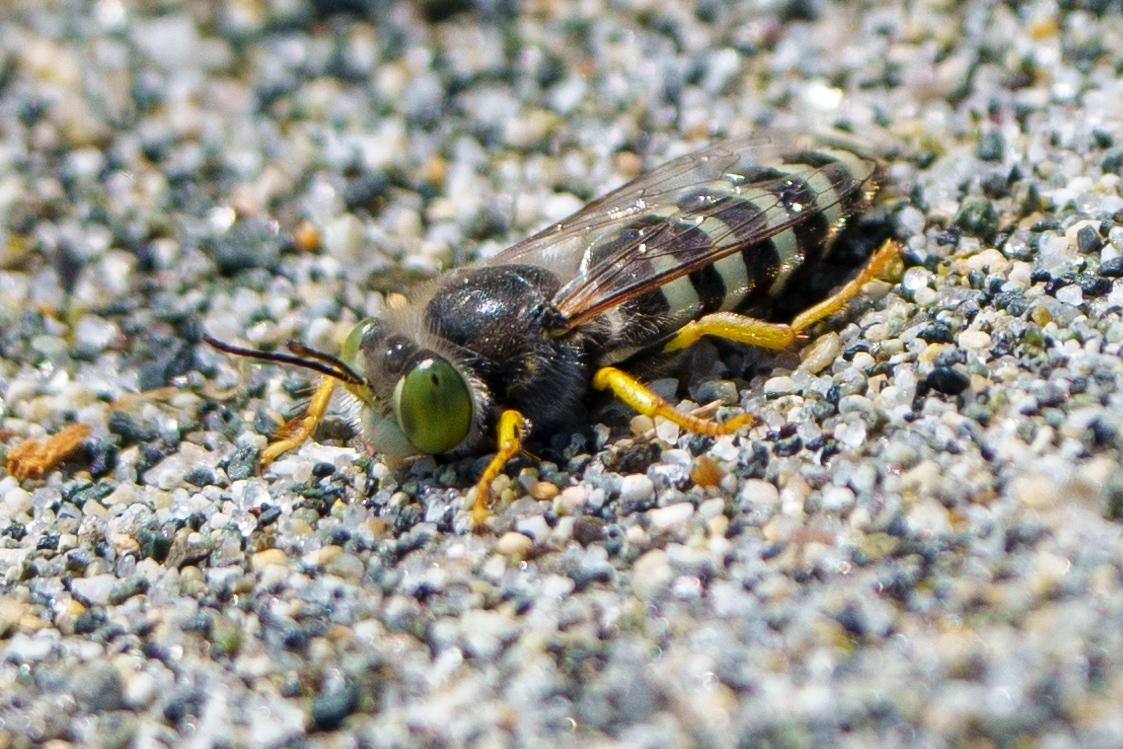

Scientific classification
- Kingdom: Animalia
- Phylum: Arthropoda
- Clade: Pancrustacea
- Class: Insecta
- Order: Hymenoptera
- Family: Bembicidae
- Genus: Bembix
- Species: B. americana

Binomial name
- Bembix americana Fabricius, 1793

Synonyms
- Bembix foxi J. Parker, 1917; Bembix muscicapa Handlirsch, 1893; Bembix separanda Handlirsch, 1893; Epibembex foxi (J. Parker, 1917)

= Bembix americana =

Species of wasp

Bembix americana, the American sand wasp, is a species of sand wasp in the family Bembicidae. This species is found widespread across North America, being present throughout the contiguous United States while extending north into parts of Canada, and south into parts of Mexico and the Caribbean. They can be found in a variety of habitats, though this species has a preference for sandy soils for nesting. This species grows 16-20 millimeters in length. Body colorations vary among subspecies, though most include five white bands crossing a black abdomen, with green eyes, short hairs covering the head and thorax, clear wings with brown veins, and mostly yellow legs. This species is active during the summer months, peaking from June to August, with adults beginning to die off in the fall months as larve develop underground to emerge after the winter. These wasps are not known to be aggressive to humans, and will usually only fly alarmingly close while hunting flies.

Bembix americana is a species that spends most of its adult life constructing nests and providing for developing larvae. These wasps are solitary but nest gregariously in sandy soils free of vegetation, with generations using the same sites for years. Females excavate nests through raking soil with the front legs, digging shallow nests 10-27 centimeters in length. These nests contain 1-3 cells that each contain a single wasp larvae. Females also excavate new nests for every new egg laid. After a larva pupates the adult female will close the cell and either digs a new cell or closes the nest and constructs an entirely new one. Males spend time close to nest sites, emerging several days before females to await potential mates., where groups of males will fly low over nesting sites to await emerging unmated females. This has been nicknamed "sun dance" due to the high activity of the males during mornings. Males can also dig, and will construct small shallow holes to sleep in during the night before re-awaking in the morning.

Bembix americana adults feed on primarily flower nectar, however, when raising larvae females will prey entirely on flies to feed to developing larva. Female wasps will sting prey to inject paralyzing venom, before carrying the paralyzed prey back to their nests to feed the larvae. This species is also parasitized by flies. Nests are often parasitized by certain fly species in the Sarcophagidae family, where the flies will follow the wasps to their nests and deposit live larva on prey the female carries into the nest. The fly larva will then engage in kleptoparasitism where they will feed on the brought food meant for the wasp larvae. Other nest parasites include members of the bee fly and cuckoo wasp families. Parasites of adult wasps include thick-headed flies, who aggressively ambush host insects and pry open their abdomens to insert an egg inside the hosts body.

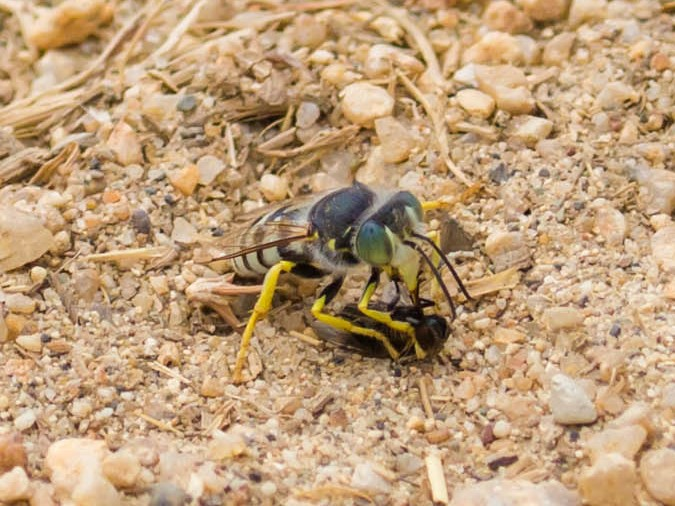
B. americana hunting fly

== Subspecies ==
These seven subspecies belong to the species Bembix americana:

- Bembix americana americana Fabricius, 1793
- Bembix americana antilleana Evans & Matthews, 1968 (Resident to Caribbean islands)
- Bembix americana comata J. Parker, 1917 (Resident to western North America)
- Bembix americana dugi Menke, 1985 (Endemic to San Clemente Island, California)
- Bembix americana hamata C. Fox, 1923 (Resident to Channel Islands National Park, California)
- Bembix americana nicolai Cockerell, 1938 (Endemic to San Nicolas Island, California)
- Bembix americana spinolae Lepeletier, 1845 (Resident to eastern North America)
