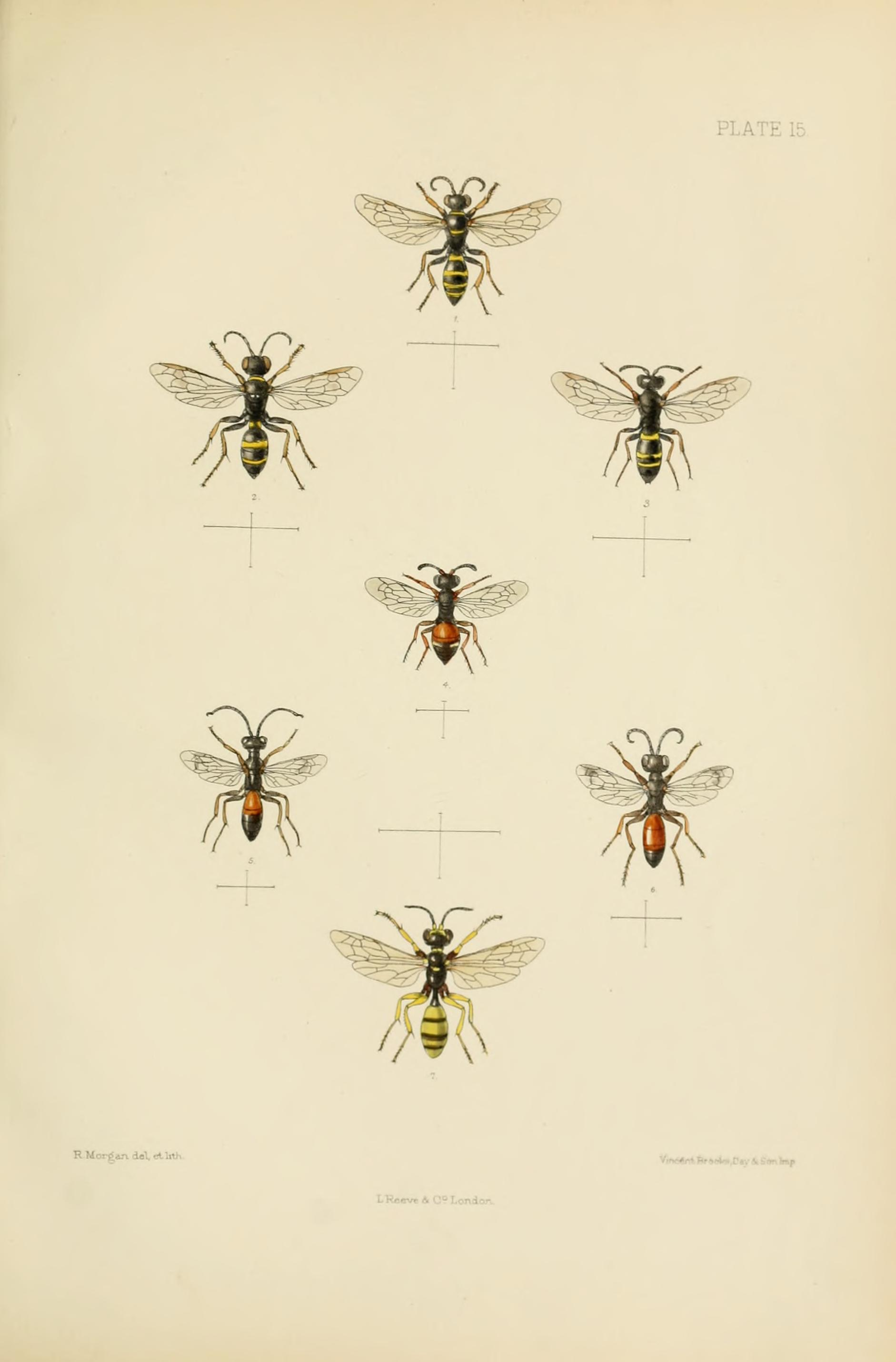
- Didineis lunicornis (Fabricius,1798) figures 5,6

Scientific classification
- Kingdom: Animalia
- Phylum: Arthropoda
- Class: Insecta
- Order: Hymenoptera
- Family: Bembicidae
- Subfamily: Nyssoninae
- Tribe: Alyssontini; Dalla Torre, 1897

Genera
- Alysson; Analysson; Didineis

= Alyssontini =

Tribe of wasps

The Alyssontini are a small tribe of wasps from the subfamily Bembicinae.
