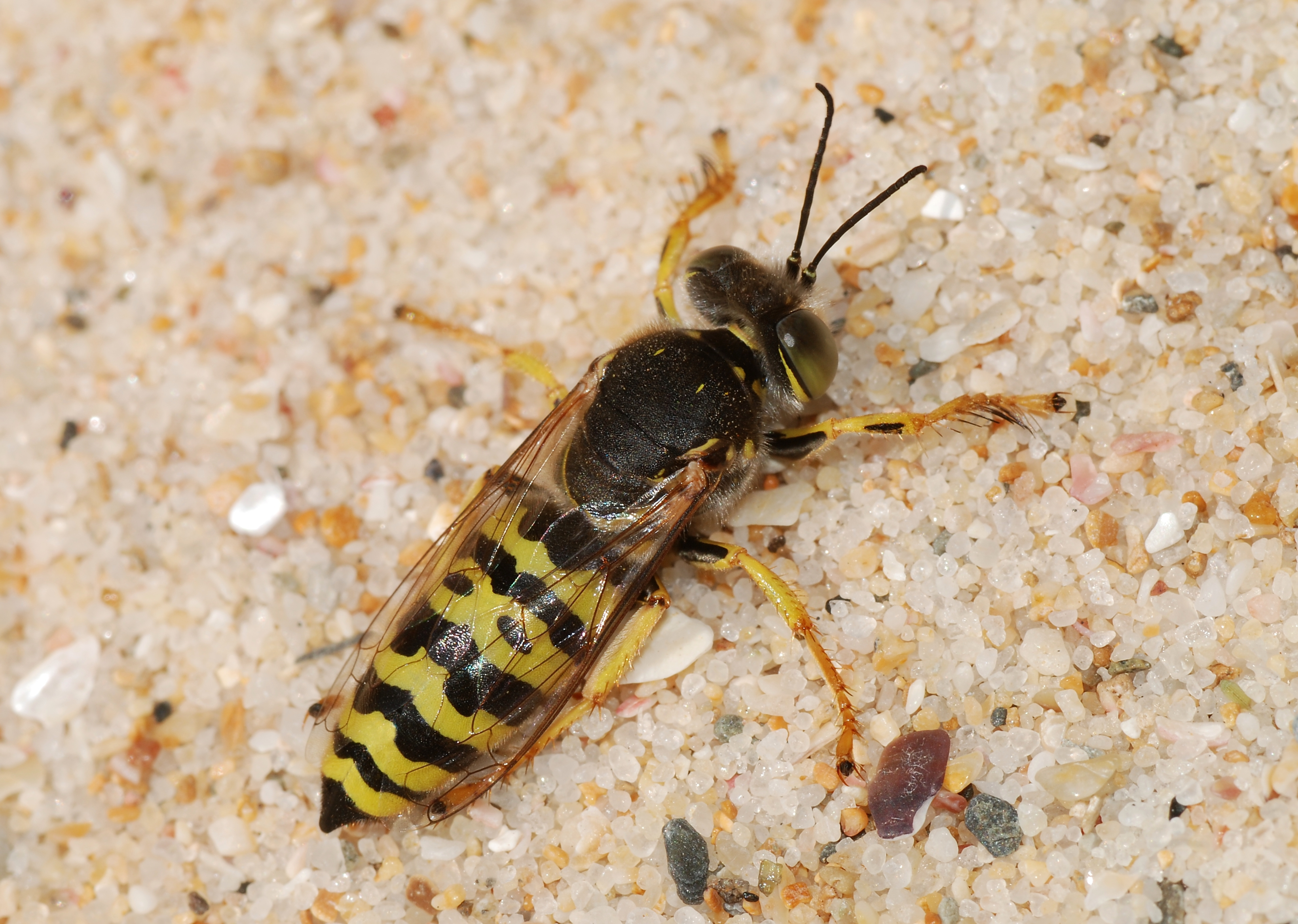
- Bembix sand wasp

Scientific classification
- Kingdom: Animalia
- Phylum: Arthropoda
- Clade: Pancrustacea
- Class: Insecta
- Order: Hymenoptera
- Family: Bembicidae
- Subfamily: Bembicinae
- Tribe: Bembicini; Latreille, 1802

= Bembicini =

Tribe of wasps

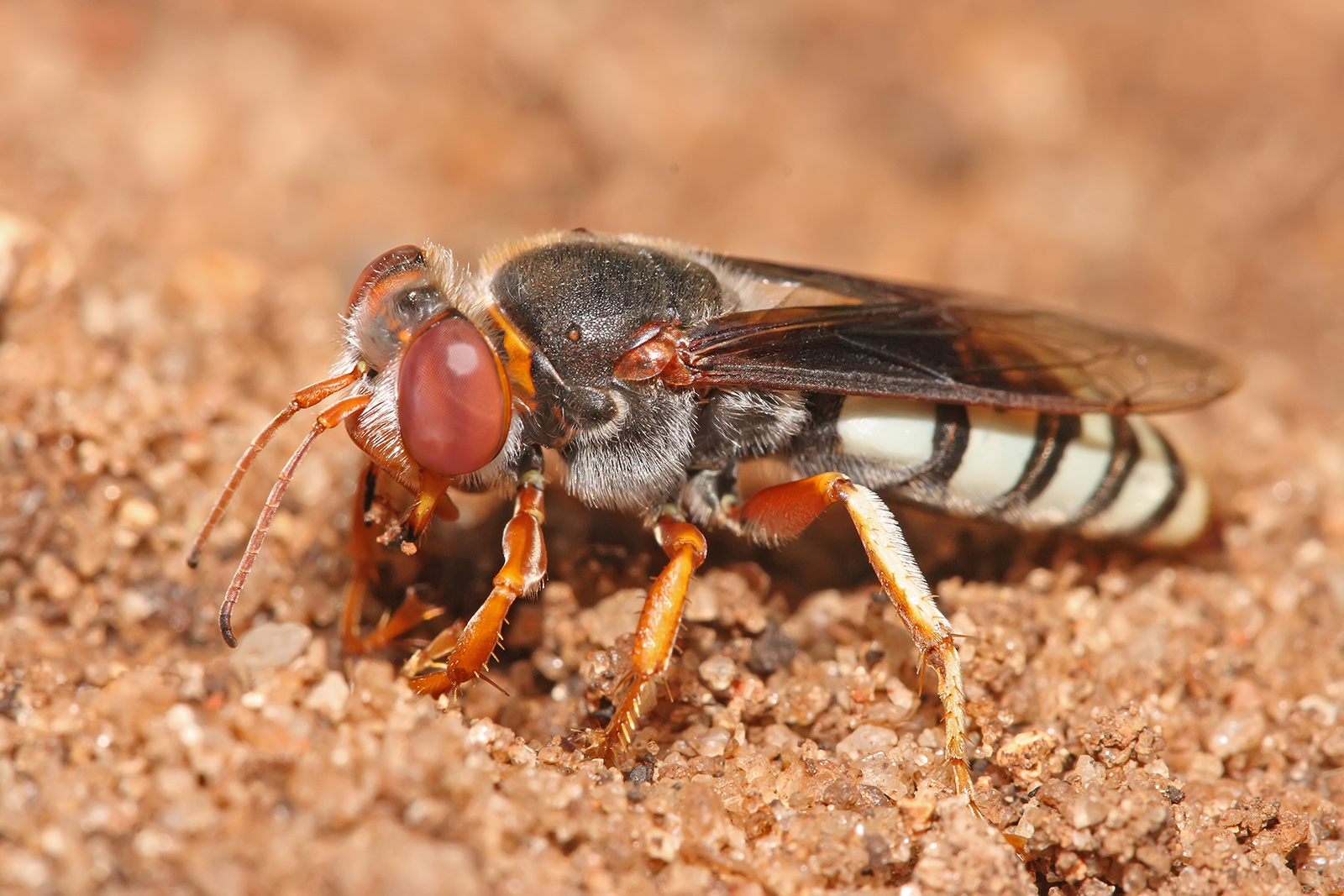
Bembix sp. sand wasp

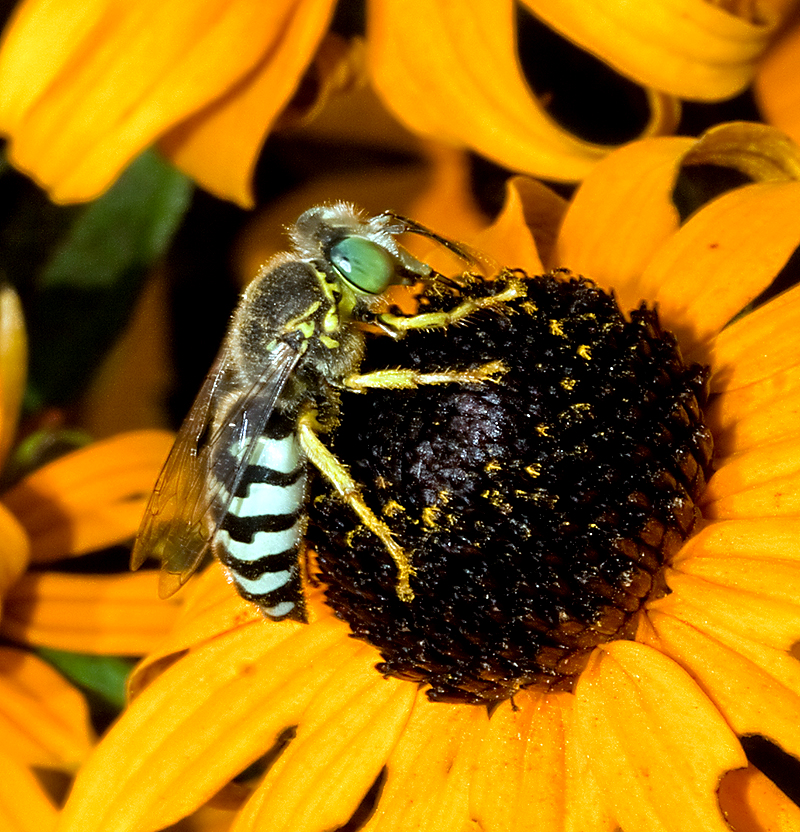
American sand wasp (Bembix americana)

The Bembicini, or sand wasps, are a large tribe of bembicid wasps, comprising 20 genera. Bembicines are parasitoids on various groups of insects. The type of prey captured tends to be rather consistent within each genus, with flies (Diptera) being the most common type of prey taken. Nests are typically short, simple burrows, with a single enlarged chamber at the bottom which is stocked with freshly paralysed prey items for the developing wasp larva; the egg may sometimes be laid before the chamber is completely stocked. It is common for numerous females to excavate nests within a small area where the soil is suitable, creating large and sometimes very dense nesting aggregations, which tend to attract various species of parasitic flies and wasps, many of which are cleptoparasites; in some cases, the sand wasps prey on their own parasites (e.g.,), a surprisingly rare phenomenon in the animal kingdom. Although sand wasps are normally yellow and black, some are black and white with bright green eyes.

== Genera ==
=== Subtribe Bembicina ===
- Bembix
- Bicyrtes
- Carlobembix
- Editha
- Hemidula
- Microbembex
- Rubrica
- Selman
- Stictia
- Trichostictia
- Zyzzyx

=== Subtribe Gorytina ===
- Afrogorytes
- Allogorytes
- Arigorytes
- Aroliagorytes
- Austrogortyes
- Eogorytes
- Epigorytes
- Gorytes
- Hapalomellinus
- Harpactostigma
- Harpactus
- Hoplisoides
- Lestiphorus
- Leurogorytes
- Liogorytes
- Megistommum
- Oryttus
- Psammaecius
- Psammaletes
- Sagenista
- Saygorytes
- Stenogorytes
- Stethogorytes
- Tretogorytes
- Trichogorytes
- Xerogorytes

=== Subtribe Exeirina ===
- Argogorytes
- Clitemnestra
- Exeirus
- Neogorytes
- Olgia
- Paraphilanthus

=== Subtribe Handlirschiina ===
- Handlirschia
- Pterygorytes

=== Subtribe Spheciina ===
- Ammatomus
- Kohlia
- Sphecius
- Tanyoprymnus

=== Subtribe Stictiellina ===
- Chilostictia
- Glenostictia
- Microstictia
- Steniolia
- Stictiella
- Xerostictia

=== Subtribe Stizina ===
- Bembecinus
- Stizoides
- Stizus

== See also ==
- Bembix rostrata
- Glenostictia pictifrons
