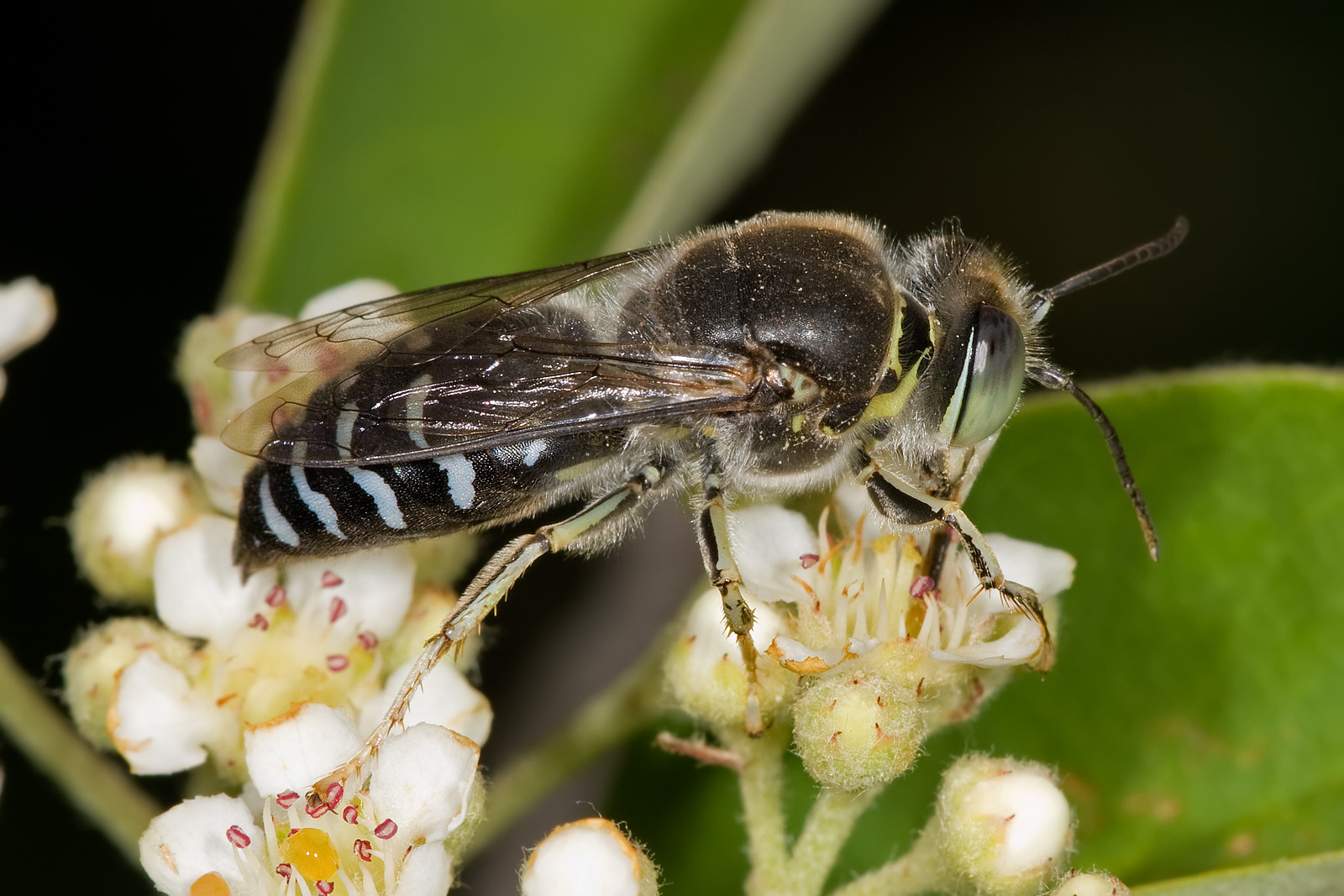
- Bembix sp.

Scientific classification
- Kingdom: Animalia
- Phylum: Arthropoda
- Class: Insecta
- Order: Hymenoptera
- Family: Bembicidae
- Subfamily: Bembicinae; Latreille, 1802

Tribes
- Bembicini; Heliocausini

= Bembicinae =

Subfamily of wasps

Bembicinae is one of the two subfamilies of Bembicidae, along with Nyssoninae.

== Taxonomy and phylogeny ==
This subfamily was formerly classified under Crabronidae, but phylogeletic revision indicated that this treatment was paraphyletic. Taxonomic work to resolve this paraphyly resulted in the erection of additional families, including Bembicidae.
