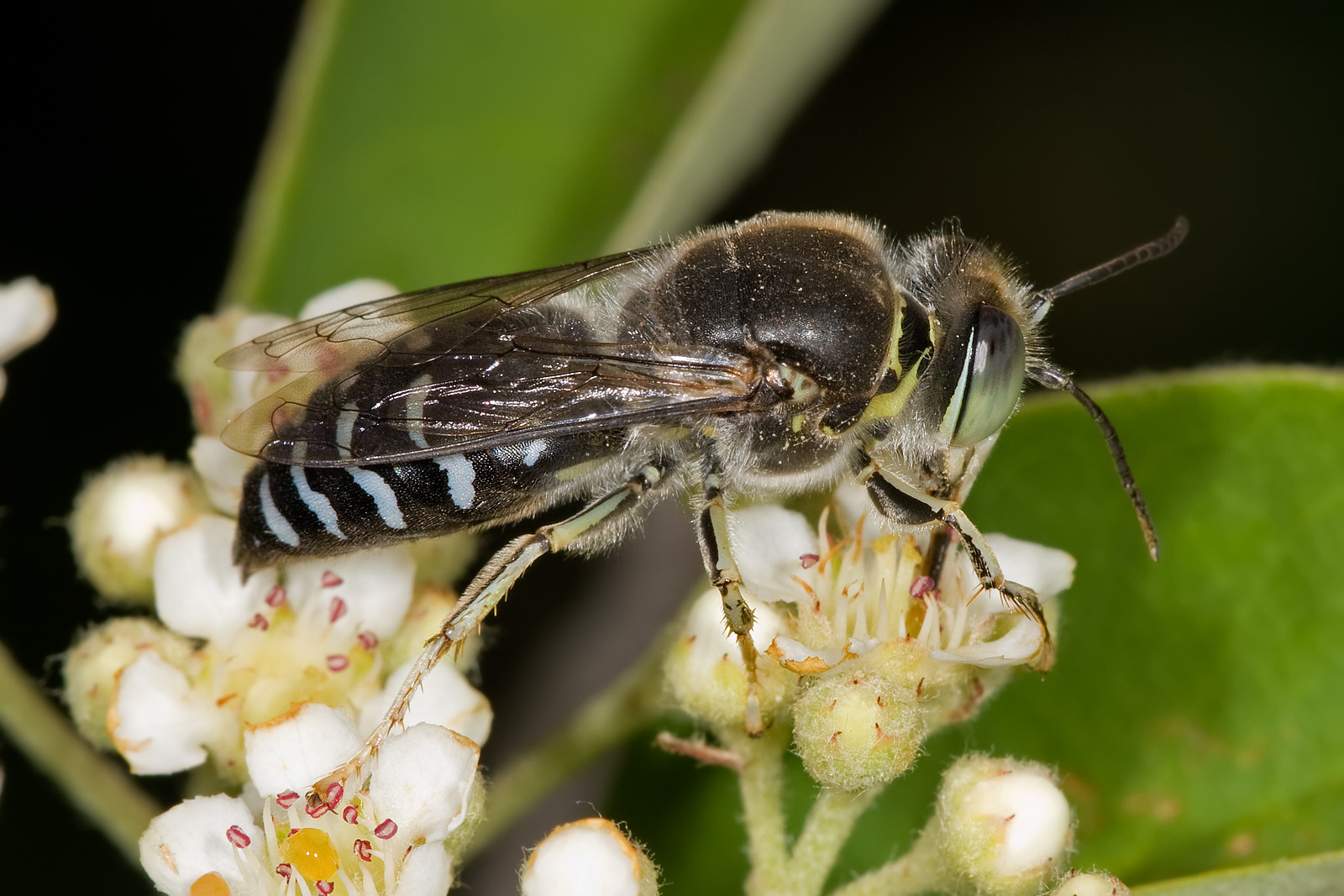
- Bembix sp.

Scientific classification
- Kingdom: Animalia
- Phylum: Arthropoda
- Class: Insecta
- Order: Hymenoptera
- Superfamily: Apoidea
- Family: Bembicidae; Latreille, 1802

Tribes
- Subfamily Bembicinae: Bembicini; Heliocausini; Subfamily Nyssoninae: Alyssontini; Nyssonini

= Bembicidae =

Family of wasps

The Bembicidae comprise a large family of apoid wasps that includes over 80 genera and over 1800 species, which have a worldwide distribution. They excavate nests in soil, frequently in sandy soil, and store insects of several orders—for example Diptera, Orthoptera, Hemiptera, Lepidoptera and Odonata—in the burrows. Some species are kleptoparasites of other Bembicidae. The different subgroups of Bembicidae are each quite distinctive, and rather well defined, with clear morphological and behavioral differences between them.

== Taxonomy and phylogeny ==
A few apoid wasp families, including bembicids, have a relatively complicated taxonomic history. They were originally a part of a single large family, the Sphecidae, then for many years treated as a separate family, before being placed back into a larger family, the Crabronidae. Currently, they are treated as a family.

== Gallery ==
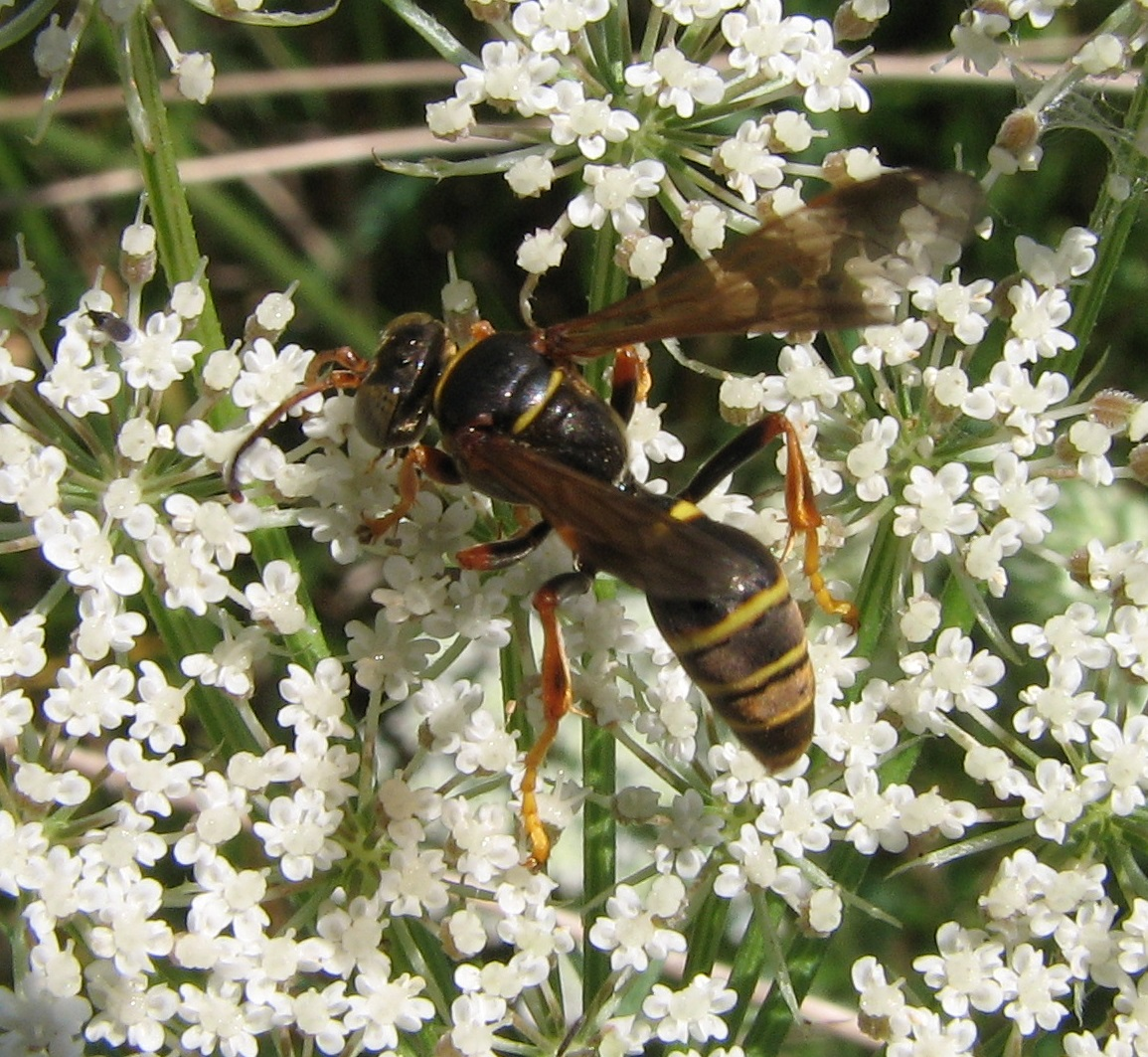
Saygorytes phaleratus

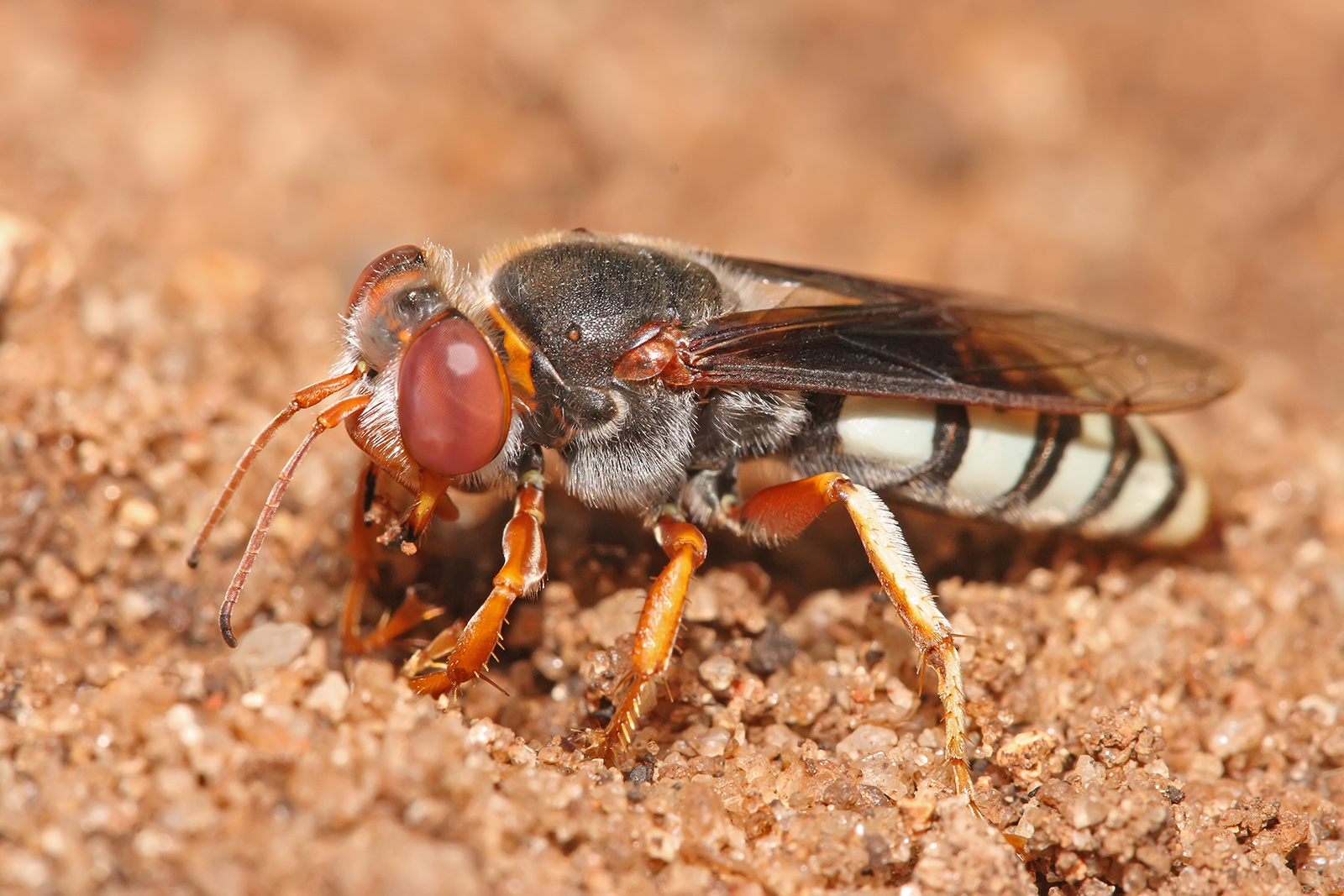
Bembix sp. in its habitat, Dar es Salaam, Tanzania
