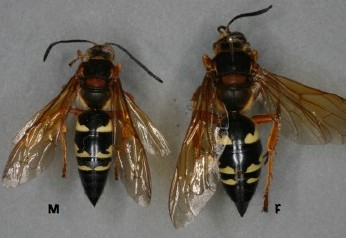
- Adult male (left) and female (right)

Scientific classification
- Kingdom: Animalia
- Phylum: Arthropoda
- Clade: Pancrustacea
- Class: Insecta
- Order: Hymenoptera
- Family: Bembicidae
- Genus: Sphecius
- Species: S. speciosus

Binomial name
- Sphecius speciosus (Drury, 1773)

Synonyms
- Sphex speciosus Drury 1773

= Sphecius speciosus =

Species of wasp

Sphecius speciosus, the eastern cicada-killer wasp, is a large, solitary digger wasp species in the family Bembicidae. They are so named because they hunt cicadas and provision their nests with them. Cicada killers exert a measure of natural control on cicada populations, and as such, they may directly benefit the deciduous trees upon which the cicadas feed. Sometimes, they are erroneously called sand hornets, despite not truly being hornets, which belong to the family Vespidae.

The most recent review of this species' biology is found in the posthumously published comprehensive study by noted entomologist Howard Ensign Evans.

== Distribution ==
This species can be found in the Eastern and Midwest U.S. and southwards into Mexico and Central America.

== Description ==
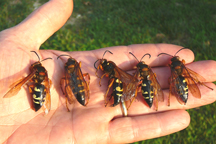
Five female eastern cicada killers, Sphecius speciosus

Adult eastern cicada wasps are large, 1.5 to 5.0 cm (0.6 to 2.0 in) long, robust wasps with hairy, reddish, and black areas on their thoraces (middle parts), and black to reddish brown abdominal (rear) segments that are marked with light yellow stripes. The wings are brownish. Coloration superficially resembles that of some yellowjacket and hornet species. The females are somewhat larger than the males, and both are among the largest wasps seen in the Eastern United States, their unusual size giving them a uniquely fearsome appearance. European hornets (Vespa crabro) are often mistaken for eastern cicada killers, though at about 3.5 cm (1.4 in) long, they are smaller than the largest cicada killers. The males are smaller than the females because they are not given as much larval food; since females must carry the cicadas they have killed to a burrow for nesting, they benefit from being larger, and are given more food as larvae.

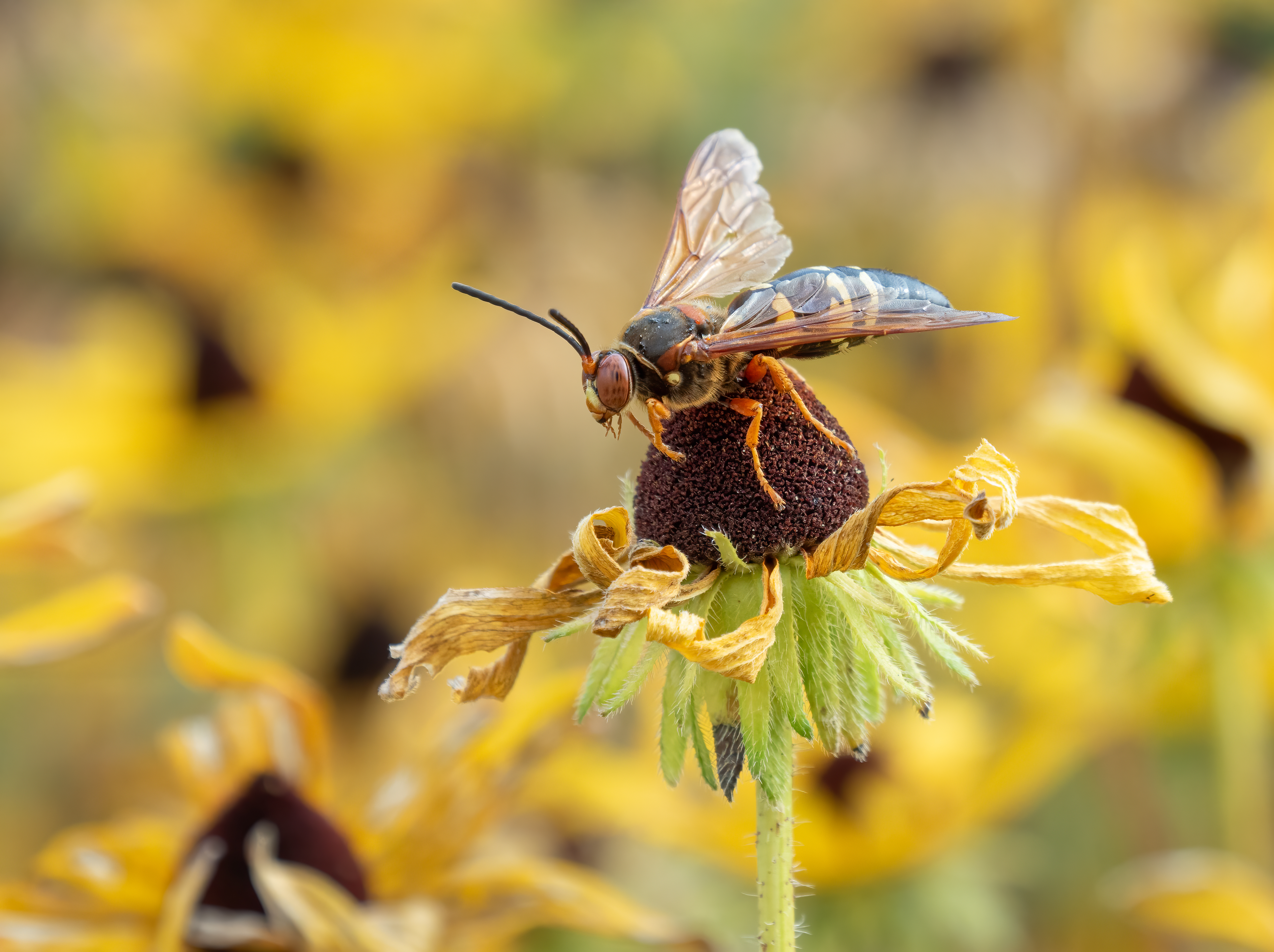
Male eastern cicada killer perched on a black-eyed susan to defend its territory

== Life cycle and habits ==
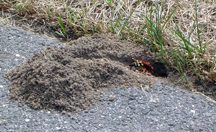
A female S. speciosus digging a burrow next to a driveway

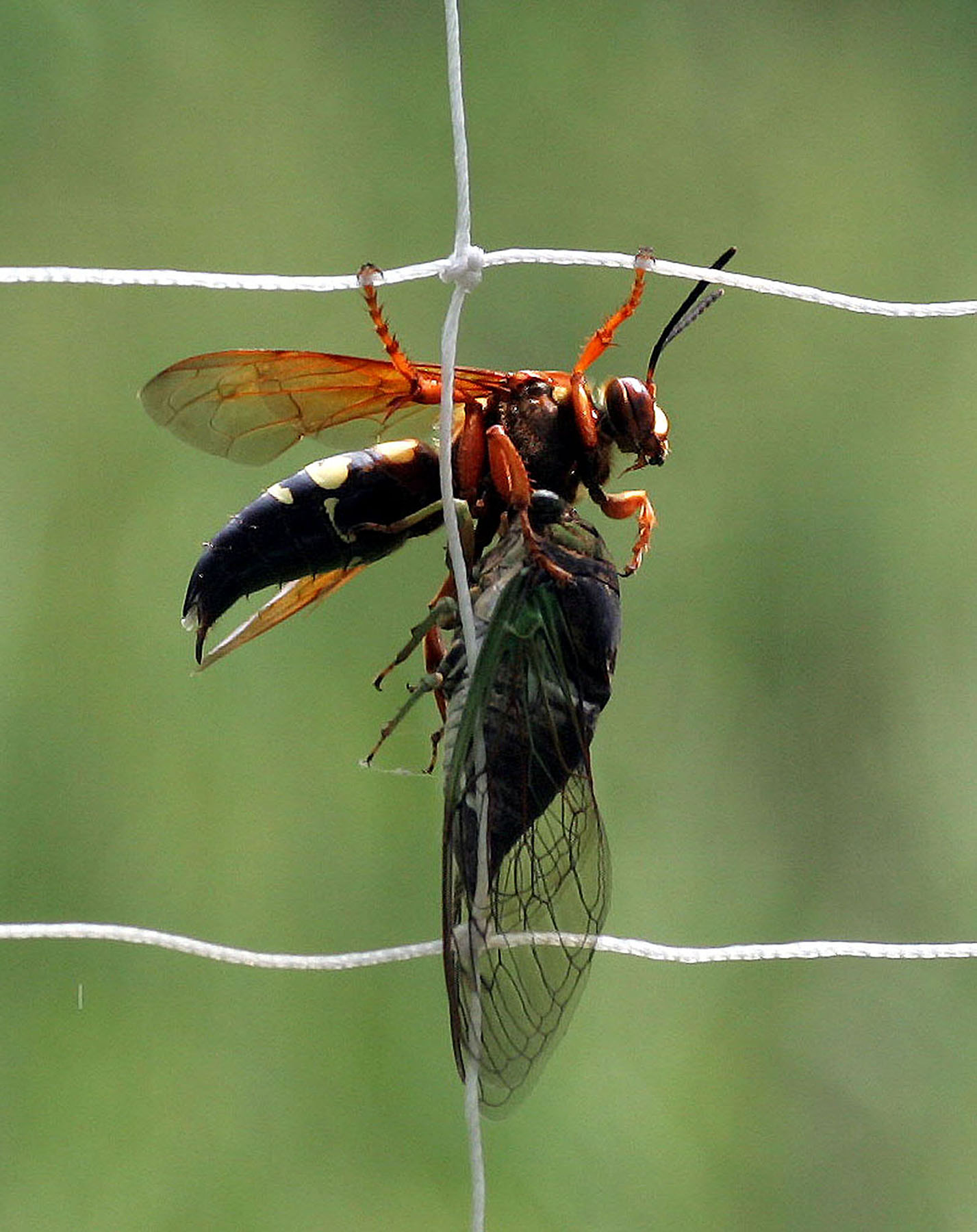
Eastern cicada-killer wasp holding a paralyzed cicada at John Heinz National Wildlife Refuge

Solitary wasps like the eastern cicada killer are very different in their behavior from the social wasps such as hornets, yellowjackets, or paper wasps. Cicada killer females use their stings to paralyze their prey (cicadas) rather than to defend their nests; unlike most social wasps and bees, they do not attempt to sting unless handled roughly. Adults feed on flower nectar and other plant sap exudates.

Adults emerge in summer, typically beginning around late June or early July and die off in September or October. They are present in a given area for 60 to 75 days, usually until mid-September. Males emerge first to compete for females. The large females are commonly seen skimming around lawns seeking good sites to dig burrows and searching for cicadas in trees and taller shrubs.

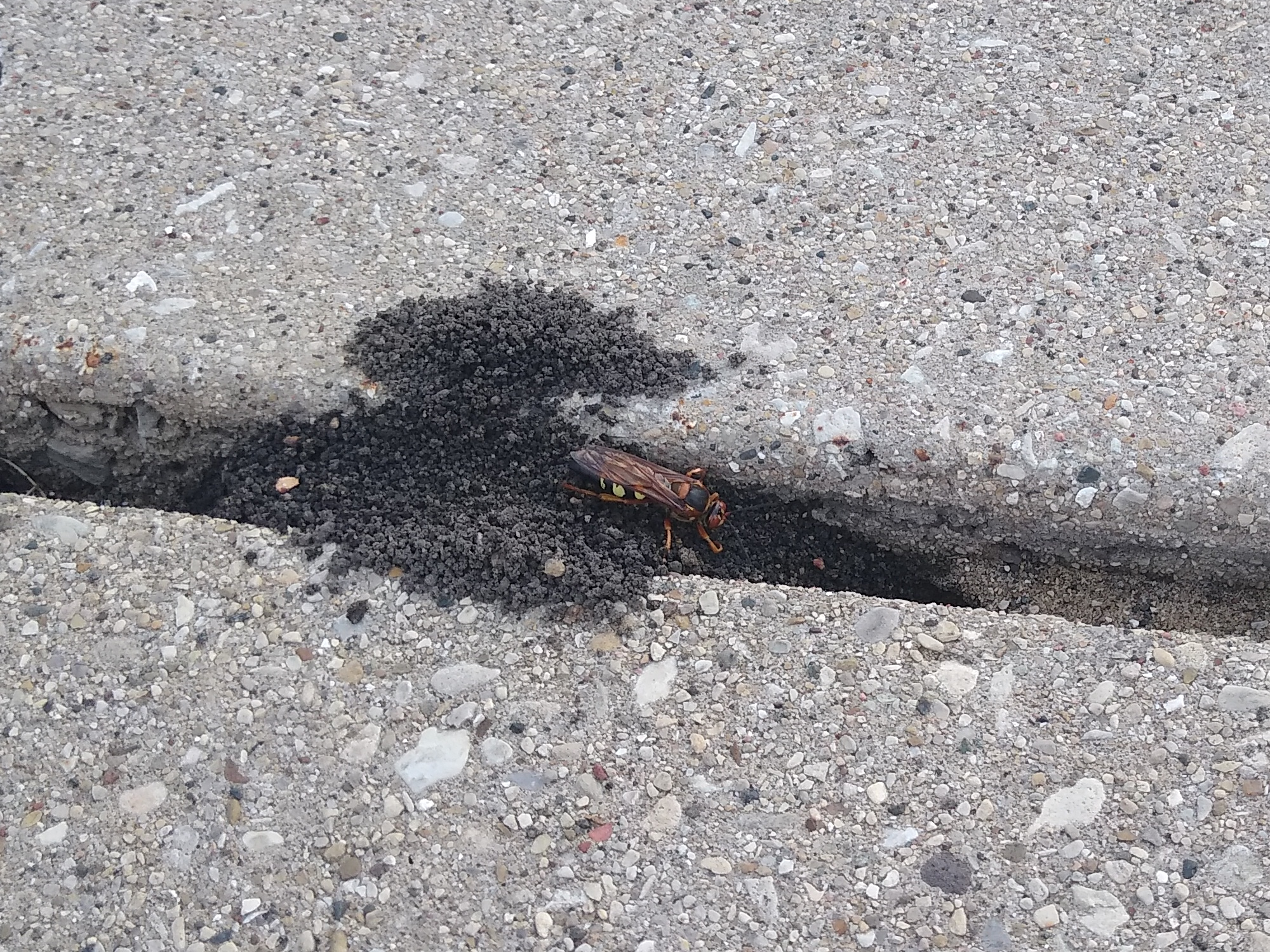
Wasp burrows between the gaps in a concrete driveway.

The males are more often seen in groups, vigorously challenging one another for position on the breeding aggregation from which they emerged, and generally investigate anything that moves or flies near them. Not unusually, two or three male wasps are seen locked together in apparent midair combat, the aggregate adopting an erratic flight path until one of the wasps breaks away. The male wasps' aggressive behavior is similar to that of another robust insect of the area, the male carpenter bee. In both cases, while the males' vigorous territorial defense can be frightening and intimidating to human passersby, the males pose no danger whatsoever. Male cicada killers only grapple with other insects, and cannot sting.

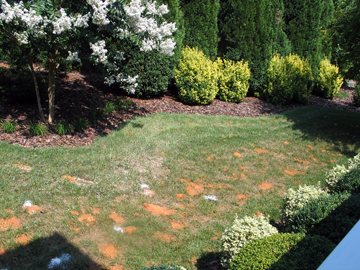
Cicada killer burrows: The reddish brown patches are cicada killer burrows.

This ground-burrowing wasp may be found in well-drained, sandy to loose clay soils in bare or grass-covered banks, berms, and hills, as well as next to raised sidewalks, driveways and patio slabs. Females may share a burrow, digging their own nest cells off the main tunnel. A typical burrow is 25–50 cm (10–20 in) deep and about 1.5 cm (0.59 in) wide. In digging a burrow, the female dislodges the soil with her jaws, and using her hind legs, pushes loose soil behind her as she backs out of the burrow. Her hind legs are equipped with special spines that help her push the soil behind her. The excess soil pushed out of the burrow forms a mound with a trench through it at the burrow entrance. Cicada killers may nest in planters, window boxes, or flower beds, or under shrubs, ground cover, etc. Nests often are made in the full sun where vegetation is sparse.

Video: hauling a cicada up a tree

After digging a nest chamber in the burrow, female cicada killers capture cicadas, paralyzing them with a sting. After paralyzing a cicada, the female wasp holds it upside down beneath her and takes off toward her burrow; this return flight to the burrow is difficult for the wasp because the cicada is often more than twice her weight. A wasp often lugs her prey up into the nearest tree, to gain altitude for the flight to the burrow. After putting one or more cicadas in her nest cell, the female deposits an egg on a cicada and closes the cell with soil. Male eggs are laid on a single cicada, but female eggs are given two or sometimes three cicadas, because the female wasp is twice as large as the male and must have more food. New nest cells are dug as necessary off the main burrow tunnel, and a single burrow may eventually have 10 or more nest cells. The egg hatches in one or two days, and the cicadas serve as food for the grub. The larvae complete their development in about 2 weeks. Overwintering occurs as a mature larva within an earth-coated cocoon. Pupation occurs in the nest cell in the spring and lasts 25 to 30 days. Only one generation occurs per year, and no adults overwinter.

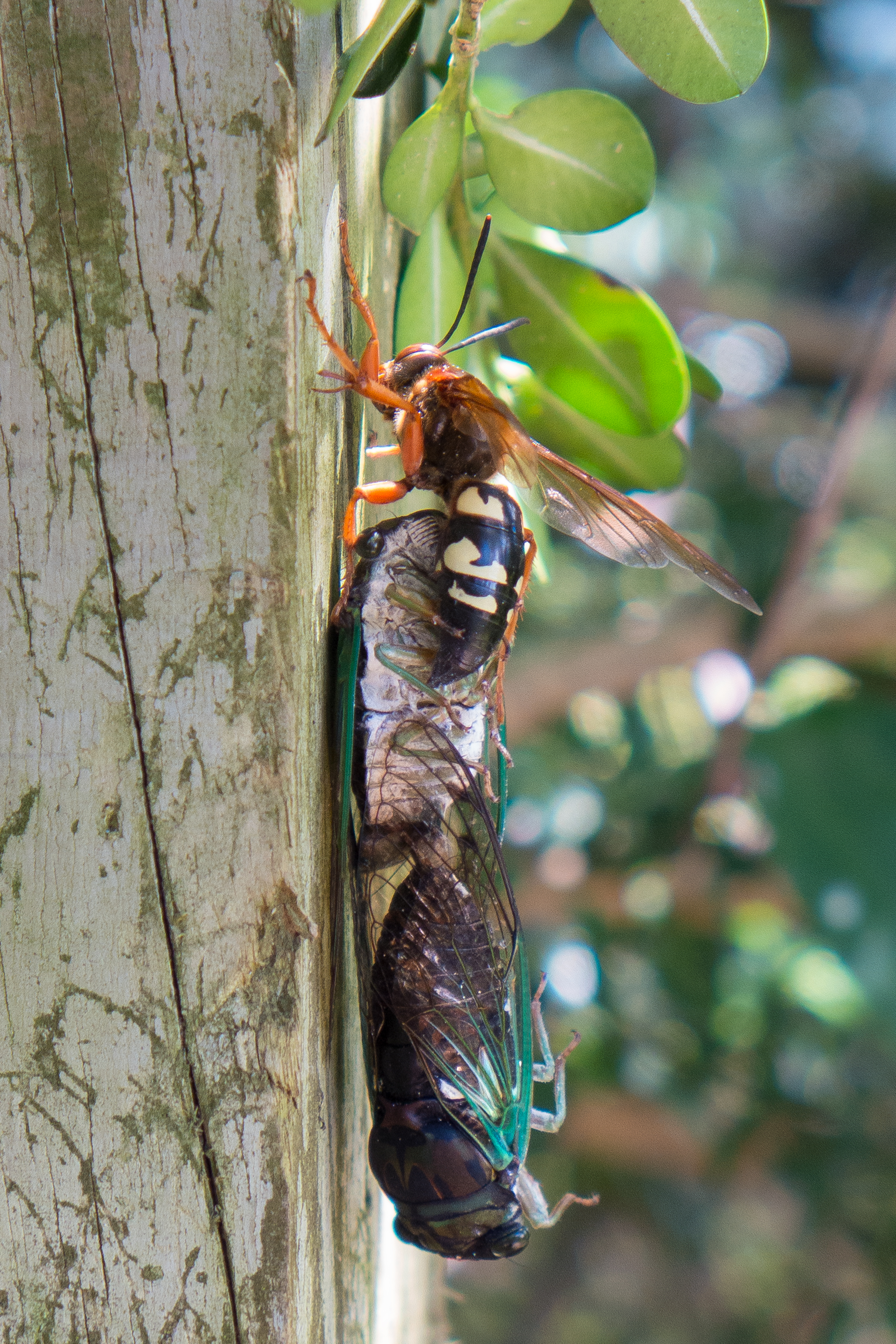
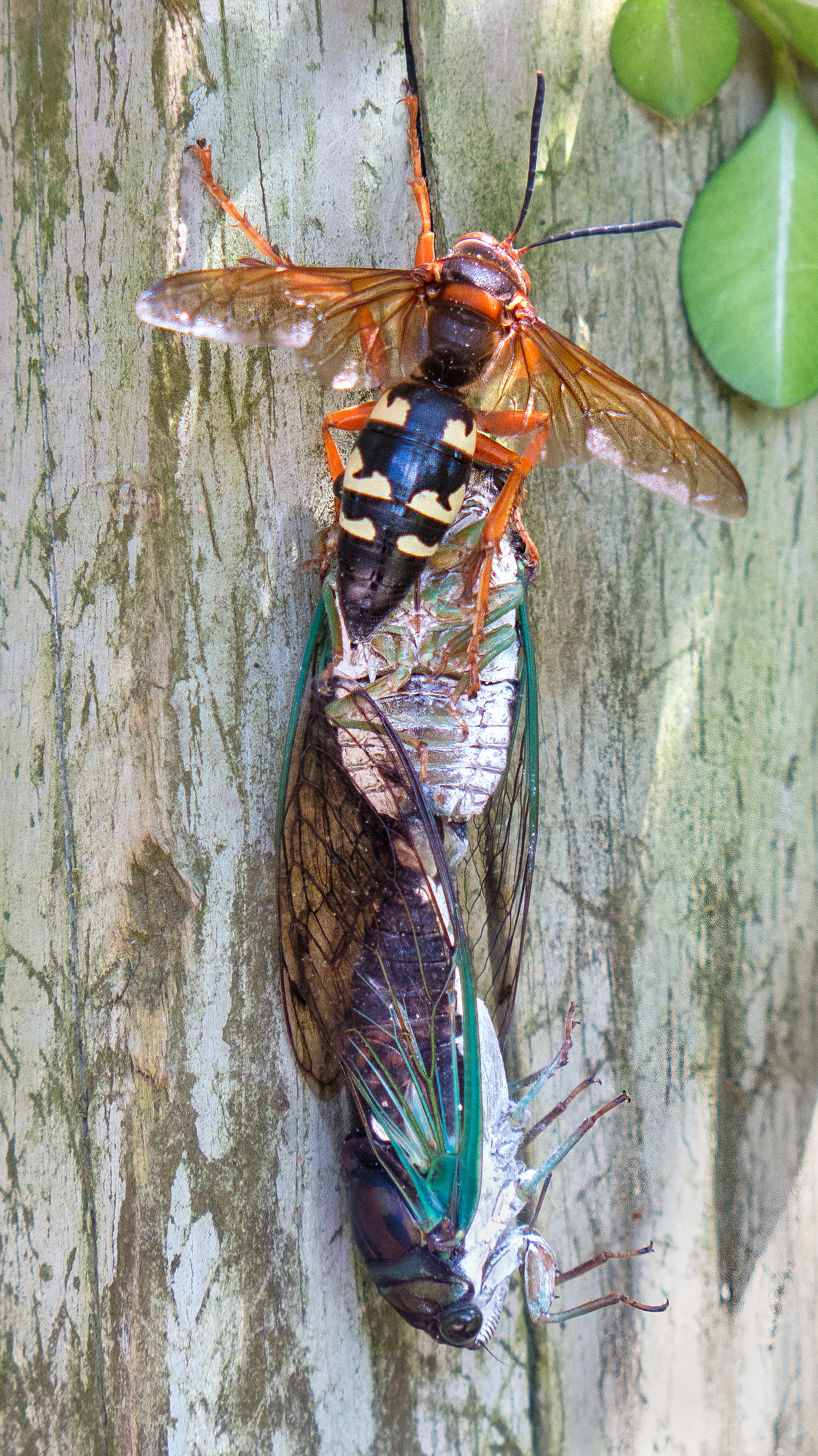
Different views of a cicada-killer hauling two paralyzed mating cicadas vertically up the side of a fence post

This wasp is frequently attacked by the parasitic "velvet ant" wasp, Dasymutilla occidentalis, also known as the "cow-killer" wasp. It lays an egg in the nest cell of the cicada killer, and when the cicada killer larva pupates, the parasitoid larva consumes the pupa.

== Interaction with humans ==
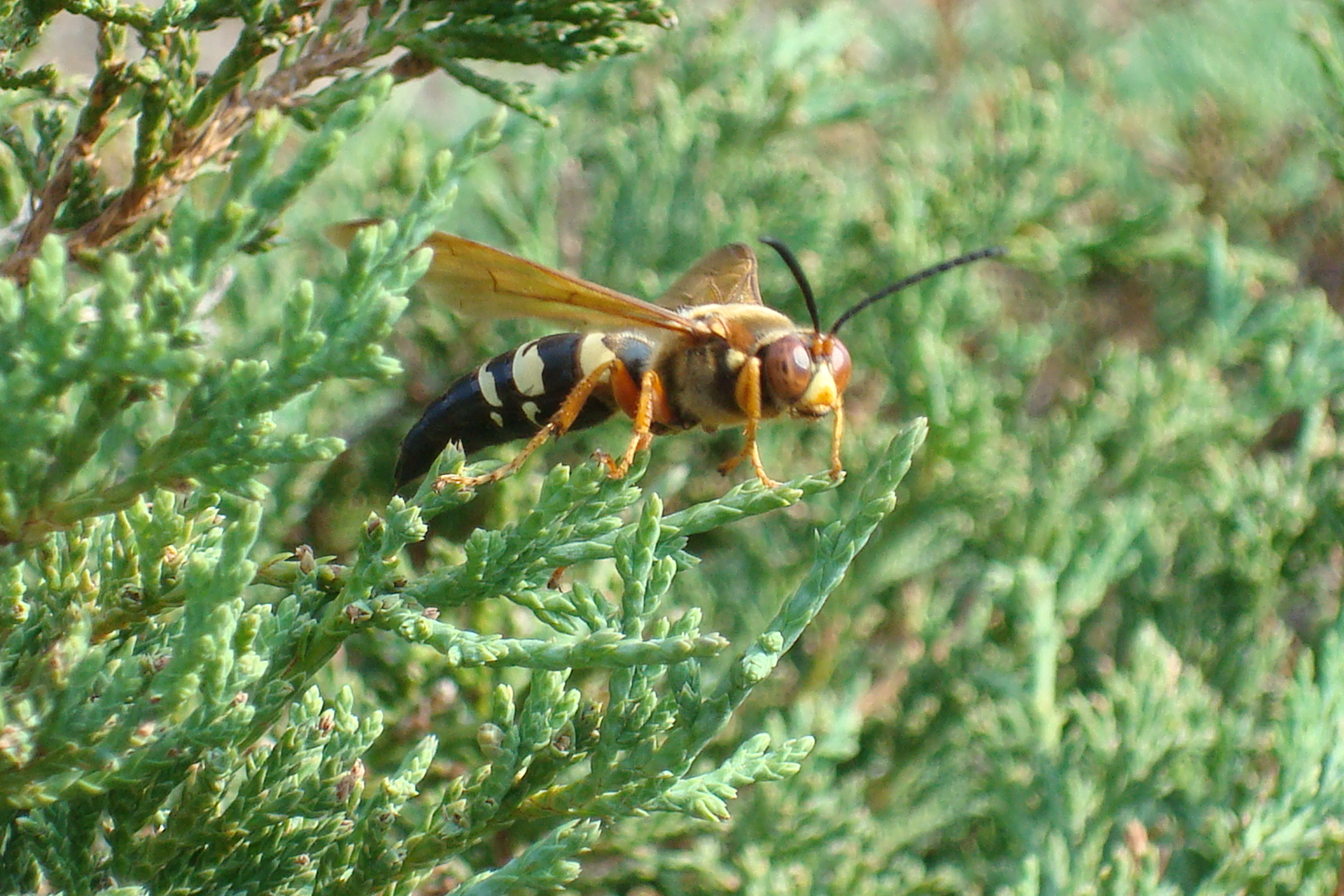
A male eastern cicada killer guarding his territory and looking for females with which to mate

Although cicada killers are large, females are not aggressive and rarely sting unless they are grasped roughly, stepped upon with bare feet, or caught in clothing. One author who has been stung indicates that for him, the stings are not much more than a "pinprick". Males aggressively defend their perching areas on nesting sites against rival males, but they have no stinger. Although they appear to attack anything that moves near their territories, male cicada killers are actually investigating anything that might be a female cicada killer ready to mate. Such close inspection appears to many people to be an attack, but male and female cicada killers do not land on people with the intent to sting. If handled roughly, females will sting, and males will jab with a sharp spine on the tip of their abdomen. They are generally not aggressive towards humans and usually fly away when swatted at, rather than attacking.

== Other cicada-killer wasps ==
The North American cicada-killer wasps all belong to the genus Sphecius, which has 21 species worldwide. The remaining three cicada-killing species in the genus in North America are:

- Sphecius convallis, the Pacific cicada killer, occurs in the western U.S. and in Mexico.
- Sphecius grandis, the western cicada killer, occurs in the mid- and western U.S. and in Mexico.
- Sphecius hogardii, the Caribbean cicada killer, occurs in the U.S. in Florida and in the Caribbean.

The western cicada killer is thought to represent more than one species. Also, some evidence suggests that the eastern cicada killer has either a subspecies or a closely related species that mimics the Pacific cicada killer. Alternatively, when they were already distinct species, significant hybridization occurred between them, though not enough to fully overcome their present reproductive isolation.

Sphecius spectabilis (Taschenberg, 1875), is found in the South American countries of Argentina, Bolivia, Brazil, Chile, Colombia, French Guiana, Paraguay, Surinam, and Venezuela.

Sixteen other cicada-killer wasp species in the genus Sphecius are found in Europe, the Middle East, Africa, and Asia. Other genera of cicada-killing wasps (e.g., Liogorytes in South America and Exeirus in Australia) are the "cicada killers" of their native lands.
