= Bicyrtes viduatus =

Scientific classification
- Domain: Eukaryota
- Kingdom: Animalia
- Phylum: Arthropoda
- Class: Insecta
- Order: Hymenoptera
- Family: Bembicidae
- Genus: Bicyrtes
- Species: B. viduatus

Binomial name
- Bicyrtes viduatus (Handlirsch, 1889)

Synonyms
- Bembidula viduata Handlirsch, 1889; Bicyrtes gracilis J. Parker, 1917

Species of wasp

Bicyrtes viduatus is a species of sand wasp in the family Bembicidae. It is found in Central America.

It is characterized by a pale yellow coloration, while lacking the thoracic "smiley face" pattern present on Bicyrtes capnopterus and Bicyrtes ventralis, the other two species in Bicyrtes having a yellow coloration. Additionally, the submarginal cell is clouded, while the wings remain largely clear.
