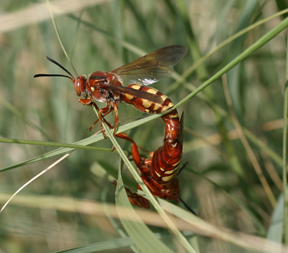
- Two Sphecius grandis wasps mate (male above, female below), in Big Bend, Texas.

Scientific classification
- Kingdom: Animalia
- Phylum: Arthropoda
- Clade: Pancrustacea
- Class: Insecta
- Order: Hymenoptera
- Family: Bembicidae
- Genus: Sphecius
- Species: S. grandis

Binomial name
- Sphecius grandis (Say, 1823)

Synonyms
- Stizus grandis Say, 1823

= Sphecius grandis =

Species of wasp

Sphecius grandis, also called the western cicada killer, is a species of cicada killer wasp (Sphecius). The western species shares the same nesting biology as its fellow species, the eastern cicada killer (S. speciosus). S. grandis, like all other species of the genus Sphecius, mainly provides cicadas for its offspring. It forms nest aggregations and mates and broods once in a year, in July and early August. The wasp is on average 3 cm (1 in) to 5 cm (2 in) in length and is amber-yellow with yellow rings on its abdomen.

Wasps in the genus Sphecius are not habitually aggressive and use their venom mainly to paralyse cicadas which they take back to their nests to feed their young. The females catch around four or more cicadas for provisioning, place them in brood cells and lay eggs in the cells. S. grandis is endemic to Central America, Mexico and the Western United States, and is found at a higher mean altitude than other species of Sphecius. The western cicada killer males emerge earlier than females, but generally die after only a couple of days.

Sphecius grandis can be distinguished from S. convallis (the Pacific cicada killer wasp) by the coloration pattern of the gastral tergites. Formerly, the two species were distinguished on the basis of the number of tergites with yellow markings (five in S. grandis and three in S. convallis), but a more recent study showed that this character was insufficient to distinguish the two species. However, they can be distinguished by the density of the punctation on the first and second tergites.

== Taxonomy ==
The western cicada killer was first described by American naturalist Thomas Say in 1824 in Madera Canyon, Arizona, as Stizus grandis. Its species name is the Latin adjective grandis meaning "large". It is one of five species of the genus Sphecius in North America.

More recently, it has been suspected that the western cicada killer represents more than one species. It co-occurs with the eastern cicada killer (S. speciosus) and Pacific cicada killer (S. convallis) at Big Bend National Park in Texas. There the three wasps hunt and nest in the same locales, and the eastern and western cicada killers hunt the same cicada species. Analysis of mitochondrial DNA showed that the western cicada killer contains two divergent clades, which may represent distinct species. The two clades appeared to be split by the Rocky Mountains, with one occurring mainly to the south and east, the other to the west.

== Description ==
Ranging in size from 3 to 5 cm (1 to 2 in) in length, the western cicada killer is very similar to its eastern cousin, Sphecius speciosus, with a rufous black hue to the body, amber stripes and a yellow abdomen. The western cicada killer has rufous spots on its first to second tergites and yellow markings can generally be found from first to fifth, although there is some variation. On average, female forewing length lies between 2.5 and 3 cm (0.98 and 1.18 in). Females are larger than males and live for a year, a time just long enough to produce a brood, whereas the males die in only a few days, just enough time to impregnate a female. In Steven J. Phillips' book A Natural History of the Sonoran Desert, he referred to them as superficially resembling "huge yellowjackets or hornets" and stated that they are "powerful fliers with compound eyes". On average, males weigh 95 mg and females are far heavier, at 256 mg, probably because of the additional weight of the ovaries, developing eggs and nutritional reserves. Nevertheless, the ratio between flight muscle mass and body mass is the same for both sexes.

=== Identification ===
Distinguishing S. grandis from the other four New World species of Sphecius (S. convallis, S. hogardii, S. speciosus, S. spectabilis) is difficult. The female S. convallis was originally distinguished from the female S. grandis by the yellow marks from the first to third gastral tergites on S. convallis and yellow marks on all tergites for S. grandis. However, this was found to be insufficient for correct identification because the positions of the markings can vary among different wasps of the same species.

Charles W. Holliday and Joseph R. Coelho devised a new key in 2004 to identify the Sphecius species, examining 4,451 wasps among the five New World species, and noting that 98% of the female S. convallis wasps examined had yellow markings on gastral tergites one to four (or fewer) and S. grandis had 98% yellow markings from tergites one to five (or more). The 2% percent of S. grandis that overlapped with S. convallis were determined by density of the punctation in colour of the first tergum against the second. The markings on S. grandis males were found to be the same as on females.

=== Thermoregulation ===
It has been found that the western cicada killer wasp is capable of thermoregulation which enables them to maintain territories during the day. A study by Joseph R. Coelho showed that during territorial patrolling the species had a high and regulated thorax temperature. Experiments found that the wasp has the ability to shift heat from its thorax to its abdomen and that the abdomen is generally kept colder than the thorax. Dead wasps that were placed in the sun reached abnormally high temperatures when compared to those on nearby plants.

== Life cycle ==
=== Emergence and mating ===
After hatching, the offspring feed on the tissue of the cicadas provided by their mother. Males emerge before females and both genders are sexually receptive from emergence in July to early August, when they mate and brood. English naturalist Charles Darwin postulated that the pattern of male emergence before females evolved by natural selection to improve the chances of the male mating. The timing of the emergence of females has evolved to correspond with the similar emergence of the cicada species of the area, Tibicen duryi and T. parallela, which they hunt for the provisioning of their nests. Many have yellow markings located on their tergites (dorsal portion), although some have been found only from the first to fifth tergites.

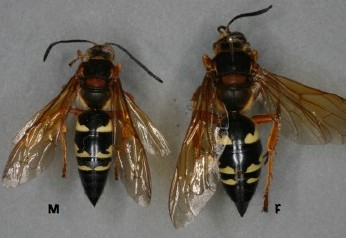
Sphecius speciosus (eastern cicada killer) shares many behavioral similarities with Sphecius grandis.

Because males emerge earlier than females, the males compete for mating territories surrounding the nests in which the females are located. During a fight, the males risk damaging their wings or appendages by butting and grappling. Another defense technique is to grab another male and carry it high into the air, which is thought to be a demonstration of strength. As a general rule, the larger the male the more predominant he is in battles. Age influences the success in the defense and security of territory; the younger the wasp the greater the chance of a successful takeover of territory. Some small males even engage in non-territorial mating tactics, and delay their emergence so as to have a fairer chance of survival.

On emergence from the nest, the female is sexually receptive but does not choose her mate, but instead copulates with the first male of her species that finds her. Once the female has mated, she rebuffs all advances by other wasps.

=== Nesting and perching ===
Males perch after emerging from their nest. They pick out an area close to a nest with females inside and guard the territory around it so as to have a better chance of mating. They tend to perch on many different substrates such as stumps, pebbles, wood, weeds, grass blades and low tree branches. Males assume an alert posture, ready for a challenge from another male, or from a predator. One study by a behavioral ecologist, John Alcock, showed that a large majority of the marked wasps returned to the same perch day after day, and two males swapped between two different sites. The species rarely perches on the ground.

It shares the same nesting biology as S. speciosus. All cicada killers are ground-nesting insects and nest aggregations can contain up to hundreds of nests, each with a single provisioning female. Their tunnel is mainly made in well-drained, bare sandy soil, frequently under sidewalks, but is generally in full sunlight. Approximately 90% of its life is spent underground as a larva. It rarely infests grounds that are rich in vegetation in order for them to get more sun. Mounds are easily recognizable by their distinctive U-shaped digging entrance.

=== Feeding and hunting habits ===
Sphecius grandis has very similar nesting and feeding habits to other members of its genus, most notably Sphecius speciosus. As with S. speciosus, the female hunts for cicadas in low tree trunks, helped by the calls of the cicada males, and paralyses the insect by piercing the central nervous system with her stinger. She drags the cicadas back to her nest to place them in brood cells in which she eventually lays one egg per cell. Females carry cicadas that are on average 88% heavier than their own body mass. It has been hypothesised that cicada killers may also have the ability to capture cicadas mid-flight. There are approximately two or more cicadas to each brood cell. When the larvae hatch, the cicada provides nutrition for the offspring to feed on.

The wasps preferentially hunt for female cicadas because they have more consumable tissue, but male cicadas are easier to locate, which explains the systemic bias towards male kills. They chiefly hunt for Tibicen duryi, Tibicen dealbata and Tibicen parallela. Cicada killers are capable of thermoregulation, which allows them to hunt for cicadas during the day, when the cicadas are most prominent. The species is mostly harmless to humans. Some males when emerging early fly into the trees to feed on sap, and the species has been known to feed on nectar.

Stings of this species received a lethality rating of 46 LC measured by LC=μg/LD_{50} (LC="lethal capacity", μg="venom in the insect", LD_{50}="μg/g of the venom", g="size of mammal receiving the dose" and LD="lethal dose").

== Geographical distribution ==
Western cicada killers are found at a higher altitude than most other Sphecius species and are sympatric with the species S. convallis and S. speciosus, even though S. grandis are on average found at higher altitudes than S. convallis. A study showed that the mean elevation for S. grandis was 755 m ± 23.3 m, compared with the lower results of S. speciosus (219 m ± 4.7 m), S. convallis (582 m ± 30.9 m) and S. hogardii (18 m ± 5 m). The species is Nearctic and Neotropical, found from Central America to the Western United States, in New Mexico, California and every state west of the Rocky Mountains, except Wyoming, as well as Kansas, Oklahoma and Nebraska. S. grandis is most commonly found in riparian zones. It has been observed in such places in Mexico as Baja California Norte, Baja California Sur, Coahuila, Nuevo Leon, Tamaulipas and Yucatán and also in Granada (Nicaragua), Guanacaste (Costa Rica) and Honduras.

== Interaction with humans ==
Sphecius grandis wasps frequently interact with humans because of their tendency to make their nests in backyards, gardens and sidewalks. Pest control is mostly unneeded as they nest in areas with little to no vegetation, usually ignore people, and females are not aggressive, tending to save their venom for their cicada prey, but will sting if they are grabbed or stepped on. Despite their large size, being the largest wasp to inhabit California, their sting has been reported as being between merely numbing and sharp to moderate. Males, while smaller, are more aggressive and less tolerant of disturbance.
