= Lestiphorus cockerelli =

Scientific classification
- Domain: Eukaryota
- Kingdom: Animalia
- Phylum: Arthropoda
- Class: Insecta
- Order: Hymenoptera
- Family: Bembicidae
- Tribe: Bembicini
- Subtribe: Gorytina
- Genus: Lestiphorus
- Species: L. cockerelli

Binomial name
- Lestiphorus cockerelli (Rohwer, 1909)

Synonyms
- Gorytes cockerelli Rohwer, 1909; Gorytes williamsi (Mickel, 1916); Mellinogastra williamsi Mickel, 1916

Species of wasp

Lestiphorus cockerelli is a species of sand wasp in the family Bembicidae. It is found in North America.
