= Hoplisoides punctifrons =

Scientific classification
- Domain: Eukaryota
- Kingdom: Animalia
- Phylum: Arthropoda
- Class: Insecta
- Order: Hymenoptera
- Family: Bembicidae
- Tribe: Bembicini
- Subtribe: Gorytina
- Genus: Hoplisoides
- Species: H. punctifrons

Binomial name
- Hoplisoides punctifrons (Cameron, 1890)

Synonyms
- Gorytes gulielmi Viereck, 1908; Gorytes punctifrons Cameron, 1890; Psammaecius gulielmi (Viereck, 1908)

Species of wasp

Hoplisoides punctifrons is a species of sand wasp in the family Bembicidae. It is found in Central America and North America.
