= Gorytes simillimus =

Scientific classification
- Domain: Eukaryota
- Kingdom: Animalia
- Phylum: Arthropoda
- Class: Insecta
- Order: Hymenoptera
- Family: Bembicidae
- Tribe: Bembicini
- Subtribe: Gorytina
- Genus: Gorytes
- Species: G. simillimus

Binomial name
- Gorytes simillimus F. Smith, 1856

Synonyms
- Gorytes ephippiatus Packard, 1867; Gorytes gyponacinus Rohwer, 1911

Species of wasp

Gorytes simillimus is a species of sand wasp in the family Bembicidae. It is found in North America.
