= Gorytes dorothyae =

Scientific classification
- Domain: Eukaryota
- Kingdom: Animalia
- Phylum: Arthropoda
- Class: Insecta
- Order: Hymenoptera
- Family: Bembicidae
- Tribe: Bembicini
- Subtribe: Gorytina
- Genus: Gorytes
- Species: G. dorothyae

Binomial name
- Gorytes dorothyae Krombein, 1950

Species of wasp

Gorytes dorothyae is a species of sand wasp in the family Bembicidae. It is found in North America.

== Subspecies ==
These two subspecies belong to the species Gorytes dorothyae:

- Gorytes dorothyae dorothyae Krombein, 1954
- Gorytes dorothyae russeolus Krombein, 1954
