= Hoplisoides semipunctatus =

Scientific classification
- Domain: Eukaryota
- Kingdom: Animalia
- Phylum: Arthropoda
- Class: Insecta
- Order: Hymenoptera
- Family: Bembicidae
- Tribe: Bembicini
- Subtribe: Gorytina
- Genus: Hoplisoides
- Species: H. semipunctatus

Binomial name
- Hoplisoides semipunctatus (Taschenberg, 1875)

Synonyms
- Hoplisus semipunctatus Taschenberg, 1875

Species of wasp

Hoplisoides semipunctatus is a species of sand wasp in the family Bembicidae. It is found in South America.
