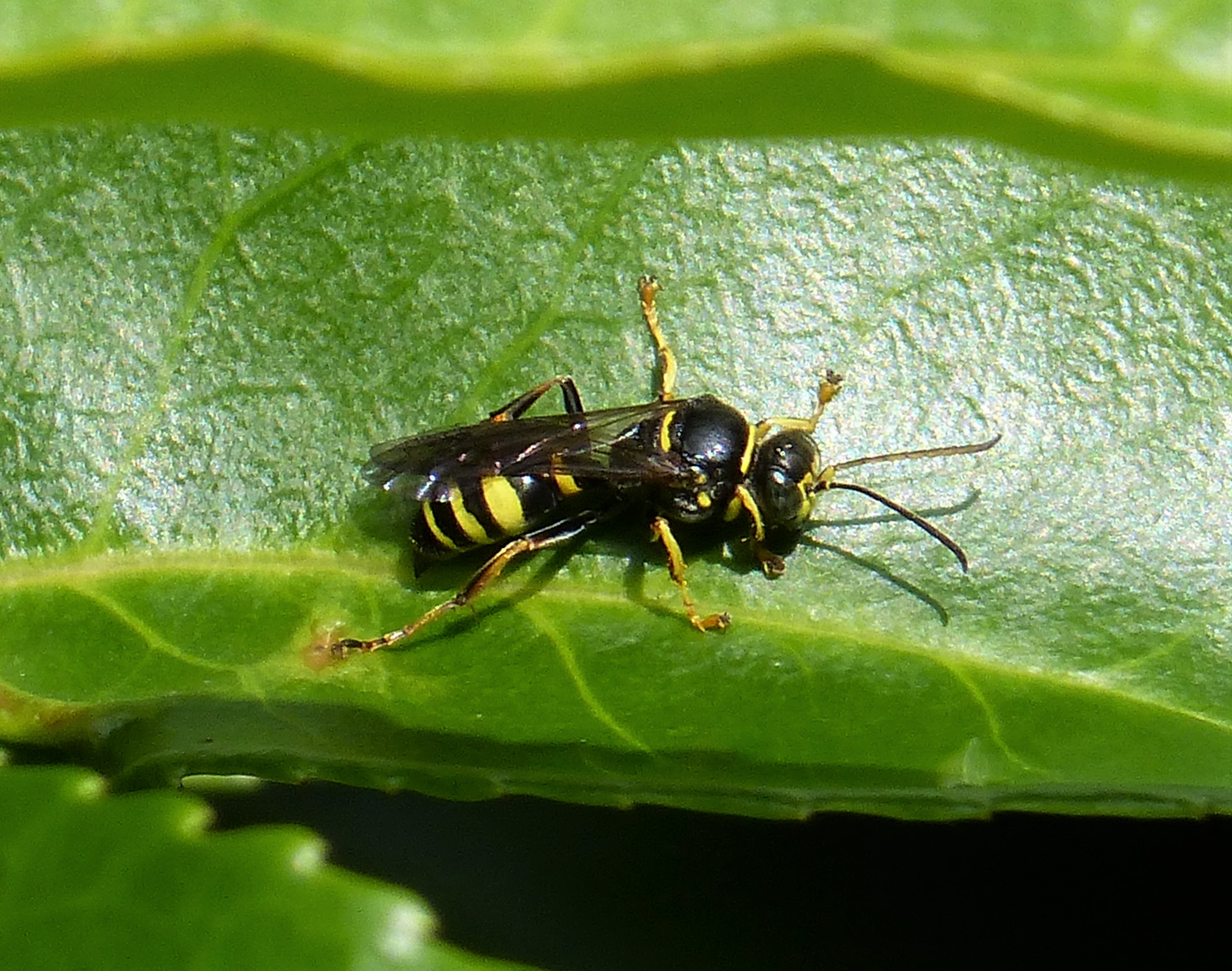
- Lestiphorus bicinctus

Scientific classification
- Kingdom: Animalia
- Phylum: Arthropoda
- Class: Insecta
- Order: Hymenoptera
- Family: Bembicidae
- Subfamily: Bembicinae
- Tribe: Bembicini
- Subtribe: Gorytina
- Genus: Lestiphorus; Lepeletier, 1832

Synonyms
- Hypomellinus Ashmead, 1899; Mellinogastra Ashmead, 1899

= Lestiphorus =

Genus of wasps

Lestiphorus is a genus of sand wasps in the family Bembicidae. There are about 18 described species in Lestiphorus.

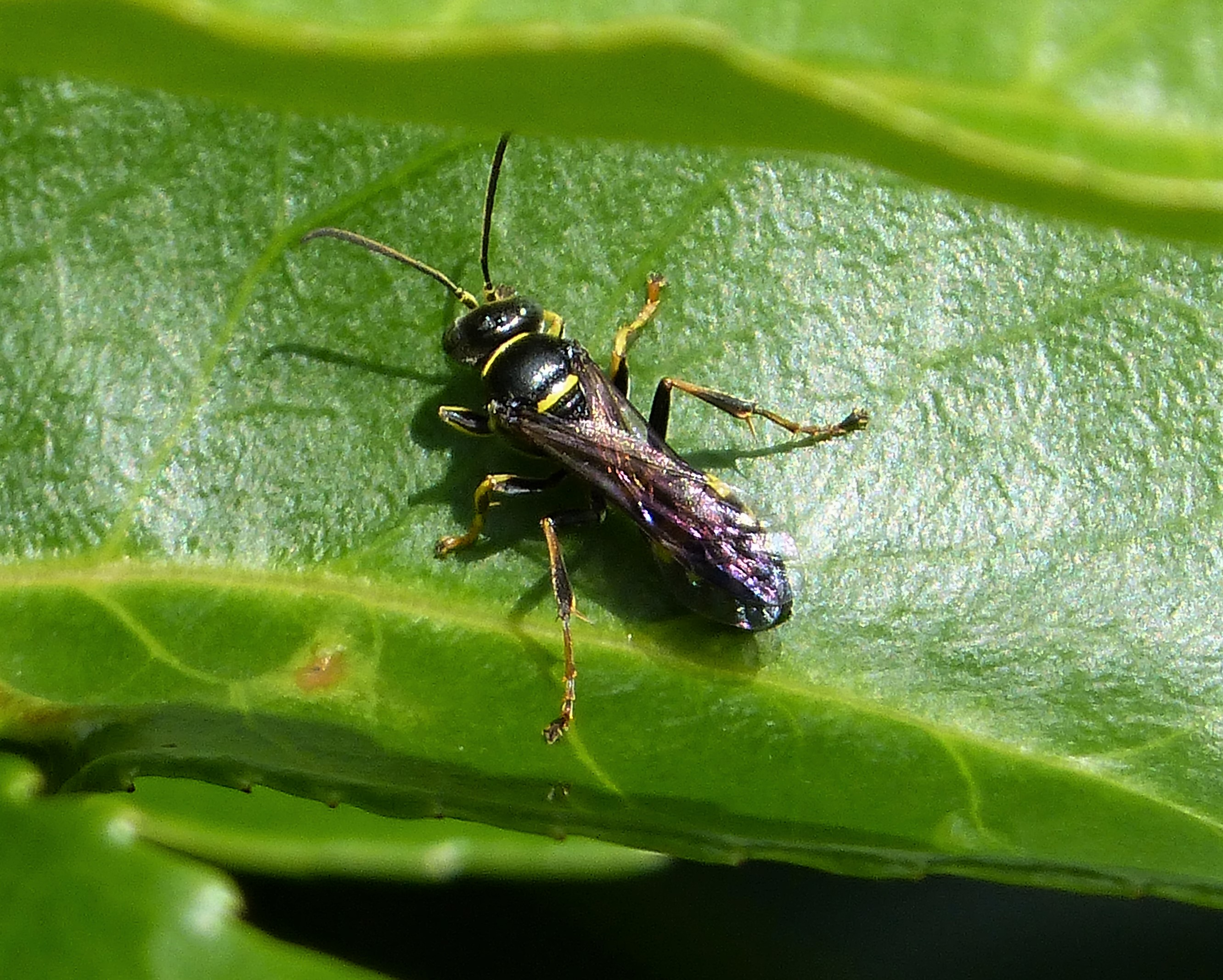
Lestiphorus bicinctus

== Species ==
These 18 species belong to the genus Lestiphorus:

- Lestiphorus becquarti (Yasumatsu, 1943)
- Lestiphorus bicinctus (Rossi, 1794)
- Lestiphorus bilunulatus A. Costa, 1867
- Lestiphorus cockerelli (Rohwer, 1909)
- Lestiphorus densipunctatus (Yasumatsu, 1943)
- Lestiphorus egregius (Handlirsch, 1893)
- Lestiphorus greenii (Bingham, 1896)
- Lestiphorus icariiformis (Bingham, 1908)
- Lestiphorus mellinoides (W. Fox, 1896)
- Lestiphorus mimicus (Arnold, 1931)
- Lestiphorus oreophilus (Kuznetzov Ugamskij, 1927)
- Lestiphorus pacificus (Gussakovskij, 1932)
- Lestiphorus peregrinus (Yasumatsu, 1943)
- Lestiphorus persimilis (R. Turner, 1926)
- Lestiphorus philippinicus Tsuneki, 1992
- Lestiphorus piceus (Handlirsch, 1888)
- Lestiphorus pictus Nemkov, 1992
- Lestiphorus rugulosus Wu & Zhou, 1969
