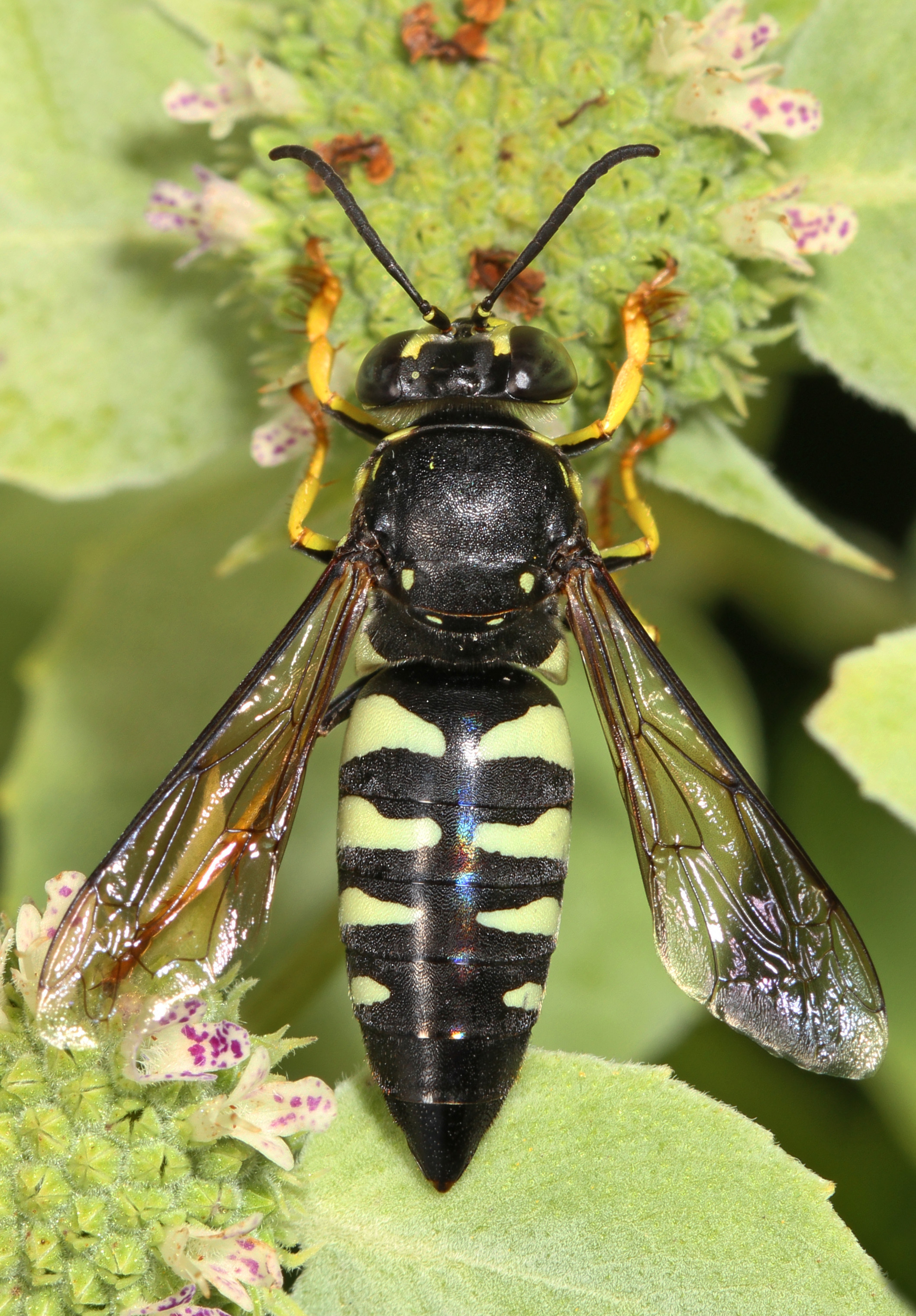

Scientific classification
- Domain: Eukaryota
- Kingdom: Animalia
- Phylum: Arthropoda
- Class: Insecta
- Order: Hymenoptera
- Family: Bembicidae
- Genus: Bicyrtes
- Species: B. quadrifasciatus

Binomial name
- Bicyrtes quadrifasciatus (Say, 1824)

Synonyms
- Monedula quadrifasciata Say, 1824; Monedula sallei Guérin-Méneville, 1844

= Bicyrtes quadrifasciatus =

Species of wasp

Bicyrtes quadrifasciatus, the four-banded stink bug hunter wasp, is a species of sand wasp in the family Bembicidae. It is found in North America.

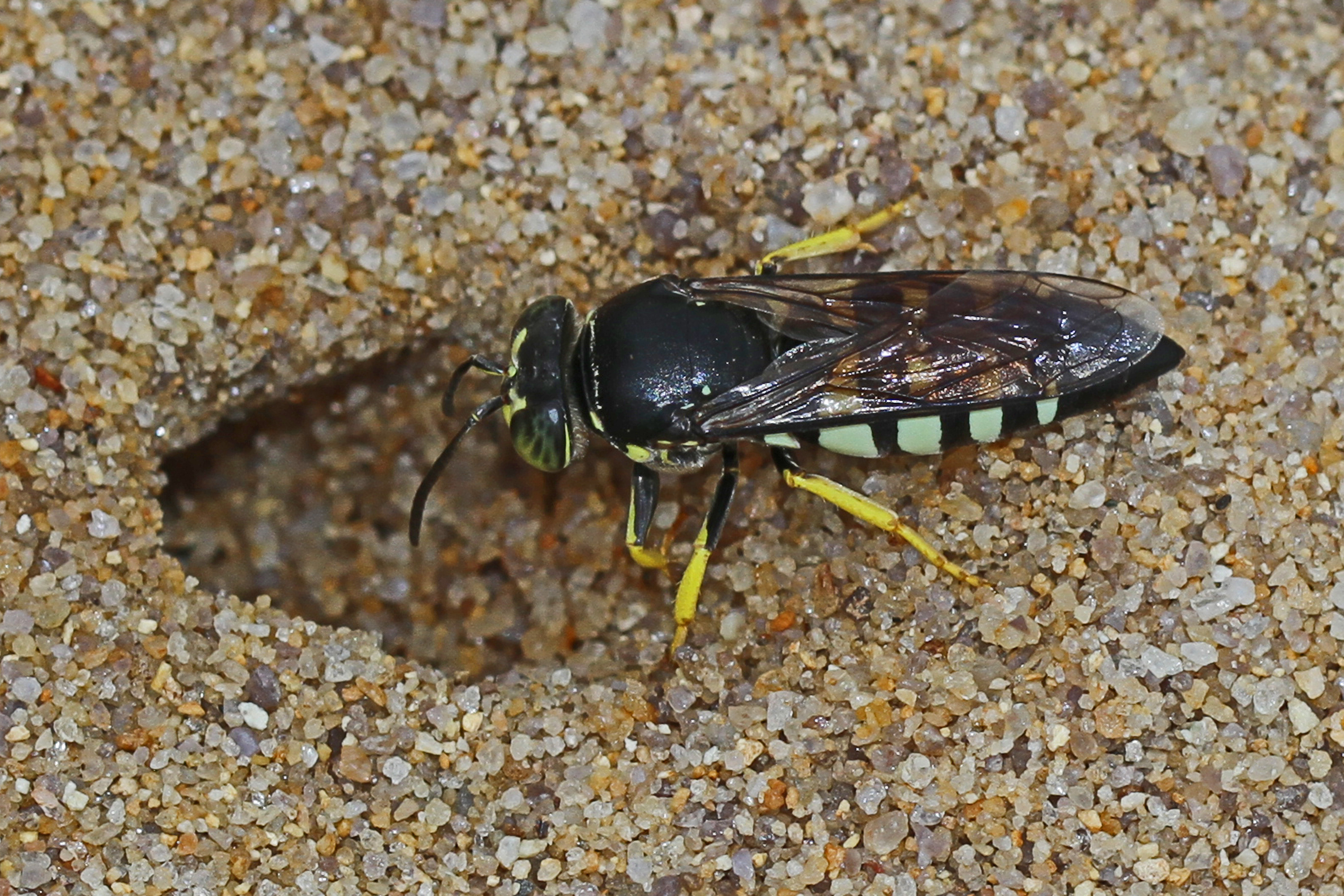
