= Gorytes atricornis =

Scientific classification
- Domain: Eukaryota
- Kingdom: Animalia
- Phylum: Arthropoda
- Class: Insecta
- Order: Hymenoptera
- Family: Bembicidae
- Genus: Gorytes
- Species: G. atricornis

Binomial name
- Gorytes atricornis Packard, 1867

Synonyms
- Gorytes decorus W. Fox, 1896; Gorytes elegantulus (H. Smith, 1908); Gorytes rugosus Packard, 1867; Hoplisoides rugosus (Packard, 1867); Hoplisus decorus (W. Fox, 1896); Hoplisus elegantulus H. Smith, 1908

Species of wasp

Gorytes atricornis is a species of sand wasp in the family Bembicidae. It is found in North America.
