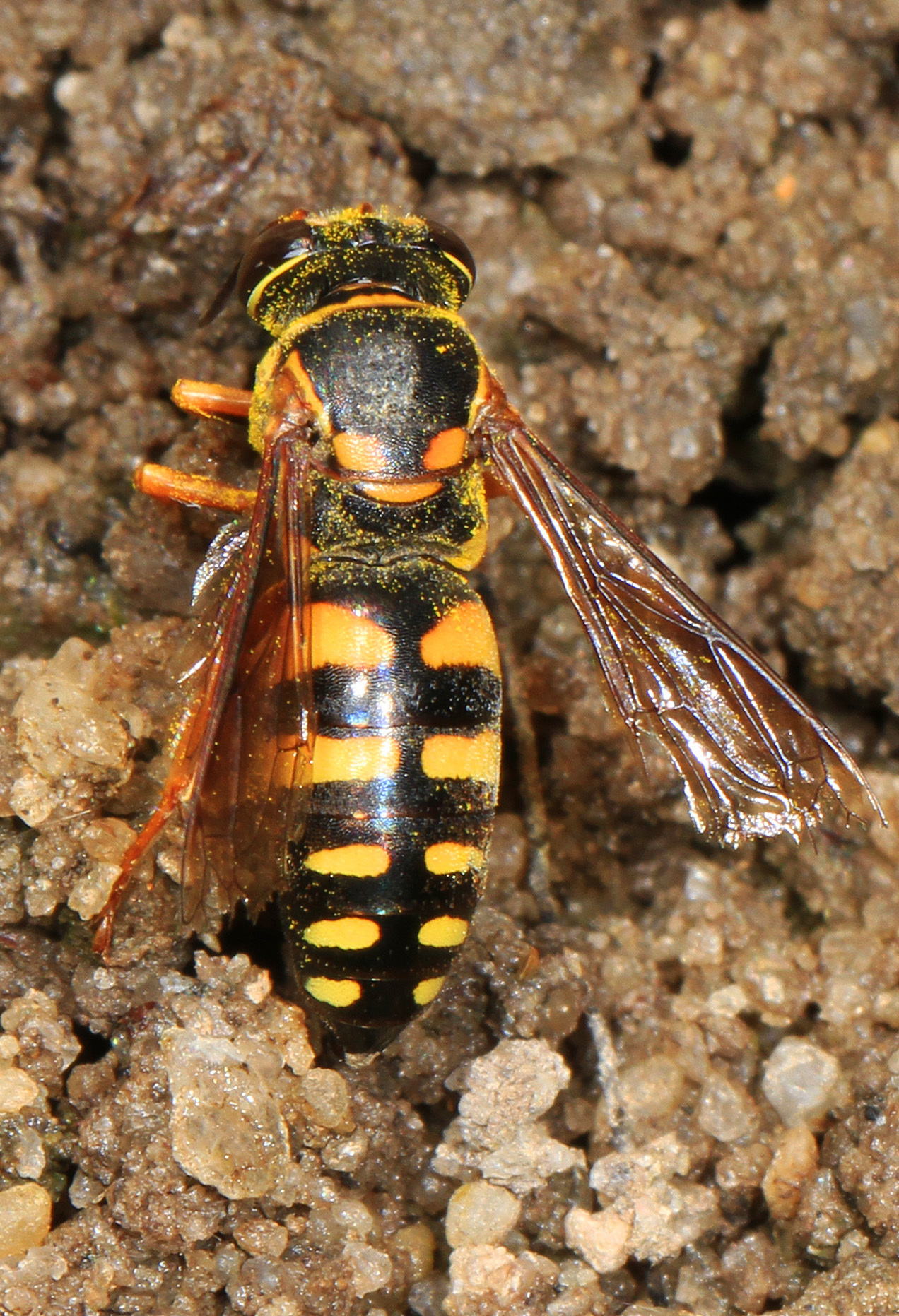

Scientific classification
- Domain: Eukaryota
- Kingdom: Animalia
- Phylum: Arthropoda
- Class: Insecta
- Order: Hymenoptera
- Family: Bembicidae
- Tribe: Bembicini
- Subtribe: Bembicina
- Genus: Bicyrtes
- Species: B. insidiatrix

Binomial name
- Bicyrtes insidiatrix (Handlirsch, 1889)

Synonyms
- Bembidula insidiatrix Handlirsch, 1889

= Bicyrtes insidiatrix =

Species of wasp

Bicyrtes insidiatrix is a species of sand wasp in the family Bembicidae. It is found in North America.
