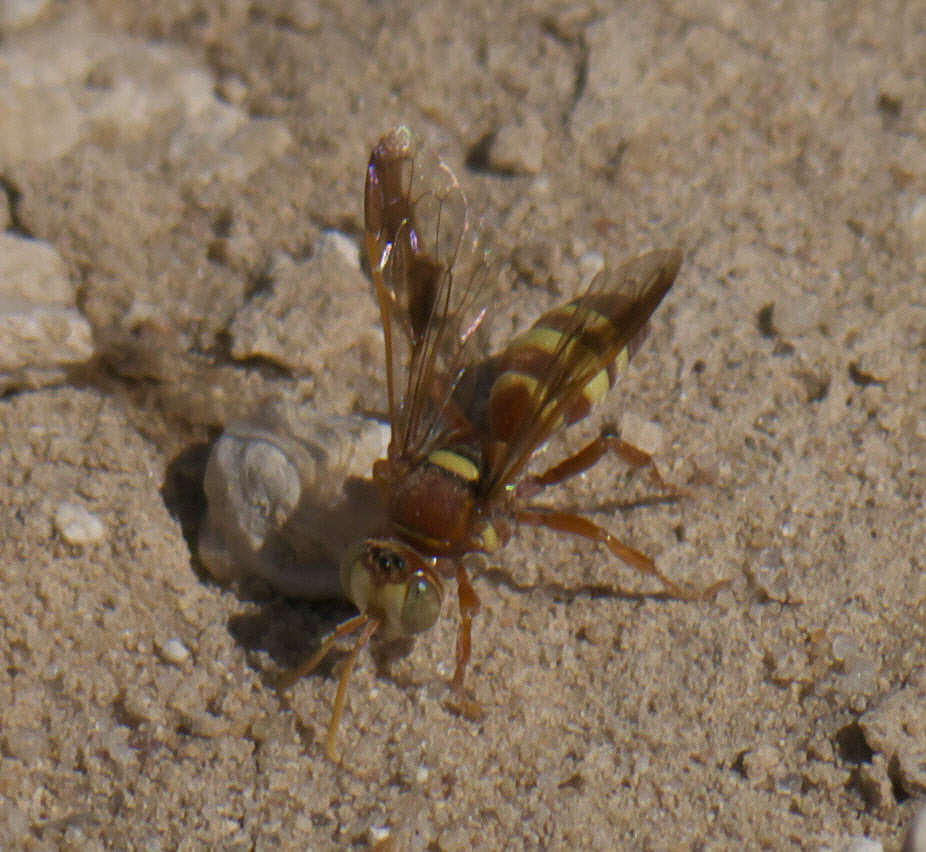

Scientific classification
- Domain: Eukaryota
- Kingdom: Animalia
- Phylum: Arthropoda
- Class: Insecta
- Order: Hymenoptera
- Family: Bembicidae
- Genus: Hoplisoides
- Species: H. tricolor

Binomial name
- Hoplisoides tricolor (Cresson, 1868)

Synonyms
- Gorytes helianthi Rohwer, 1911; Gorytes rufocaudatus (Mickel, 1916); Gorytes tricolor Cresson, 1868; Hoplisus rufocaudatus Mickel, 1916

= Hoplisoides tricolor =

Species of wasp

Hoplisoides tricolor is a species of sand wasp in the family Bembicidae. It is found in Central America and North America.

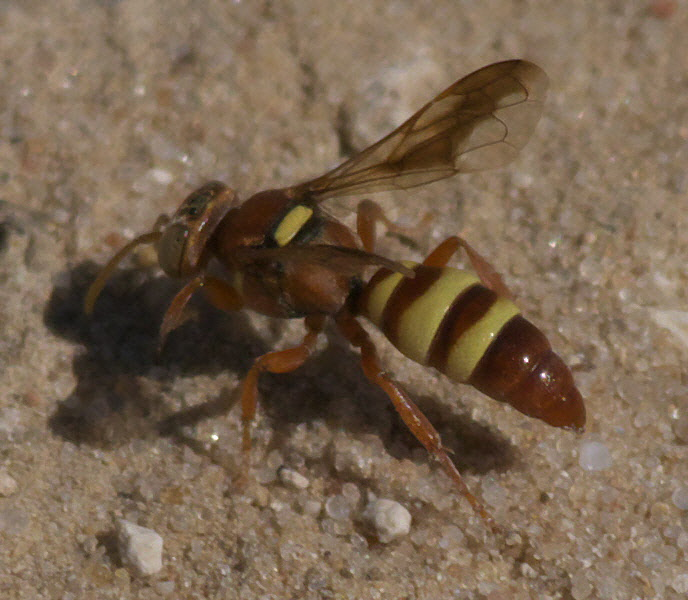
