= Hoplisoides costalis =

Scientific classification
- Domain: Eukaryota
- Kingdom: Animalia
- Phylum: Arthropoda
- Class: Insecta
- Order: Hymenoptera
- Family: Bembicidae
- Genus: Hoplisoides
- Species: H. costalis

Binomial name
- Hoplisoides costalis (Cresson, 1873)

Synonyms
- Gorytes costalis Cresson, 1873; Gorytes knabi Rohwer, 1911; Hoplisoides knabi (Rohwer, 1911)

Species of wasp

Hoplisoides costalis is a species of sand wasp in the family Bembicidae. It is found in Central America and North America.
