= Hoplisoides hamatus =

Scientific classification
- Domain: Eukaryota
- Kingdom: Animalia
- Phylum: Arthropoda
- Class: Insecta
- Order: Hymenoptera
- Family: Bembicidae
- Genus: Hoplisoides
- Species: H. hamatus

Binomial name
- Hoplisoides hamatus (Handlirsch, 1888)

Synonyms
- Gorytes adornatus Handlirsch, 1888; Gorytes arizonensis Handlirsch, 1895; Gorytes hamatus (Handlirsch, 1895); Gorytes spilographus (Handlirsch, 1895); Hoplisoides arizonensis C. Baker, 1907; Hoplisoides spilographus (C. Baker, 1907); Psammaecius adornatus (C. Baker, 1907); Psammaecius arizonensis Bradley, 1920; Psammaecius spilographus (Bradley, 1920)

Species of wasp

Hoplisoides hamatus is a species of sand wasp in the family Bembicidae. It is found in North America.
