= Hoplisoides nebulosus =

Scientific classification
- Domain: Eukaryota
- Kingdom: Animalia
- Phylum: Arthropoda
- Class: Insecta
- Order: Hymenoptera
- Family: Bembicidae
- Genus: Hoplisoides
- Species: H. nebulosus

Binomial name
- Hoplisoides nebulosus (Packard, 1867)

Synonyms
- Gorytes armatus Provancher, 1887; Gorytes microcephalus Handlirsch, 1888; Gorytes nebulosus Packard, 1867; Hoplisoides armatus (Provancher, 1887); Hoplisoides microcephalus (Handlirsch, 1888); Hoplisus microcephalus (Handlirsch, 1888); Philanthus harringtonii Provancher, 1888; Psammaecius armatus (Provancher, 1887); Psammaecius microcephalus (Handlirsch, 1888)

Species of wasp

Hoplisoides nebulosus is a species of sand wasp in the family Bembicidae. It is found in North America.

== Subspecies ==
These two subspecies belong to the species Hoplisoides nebulosus:

- Hoplisoides nebulosus nebulosus (Packard, 1867)
- Hoplisoides nebulosus spilopterus (Handlirsch, 1888)
