= Sagenista (wasp) =

Scientific classification
- Domain: Eukaryota
- Kingdom: Animalia
- Phylum: Arthropoda
- Class: Insecta
- Order: Hymenoptera
- Family: Bembicidae
- Subtribe: Gorytina
- Genus: Sagenista; R. Bohart, 1967

Genus of wasps

Sagenista is a genus of sand wasps in the family Bembicidae. There are about 10 described species in Sagenista.

== Species ==
These 10 species belong to the genus Sagenista:

- Sagenista austera (Handlirsch, 1893)^{i c g}
- Sagenista brasiliensis (Shuckard, 1838)^{i c g}
- Sagenista cayennensis (Spinola, 1842)^{i c g}
- Sagenista cingulata R. Bohart, 2000^{i c g}
- Sagenista kimseyorum R. Bohart, 2000^{i c g}
- Sagenista pilosa R. Bohart, 2000^{i c g}
- Sagenista scutellaris (Spinola, 1842)^{i c g}
- Sagenista sericata (F. Smith, 1856)^{i c g}
- Sagenista tucumanae R. Bohart, 2000^{i c g}
- Sagenista vardyi R. Bohart, 2000^{i c g}

Data sources: i = ITIS, c = Catalogue of Life, g = GBIF, b = Bugguide.net
