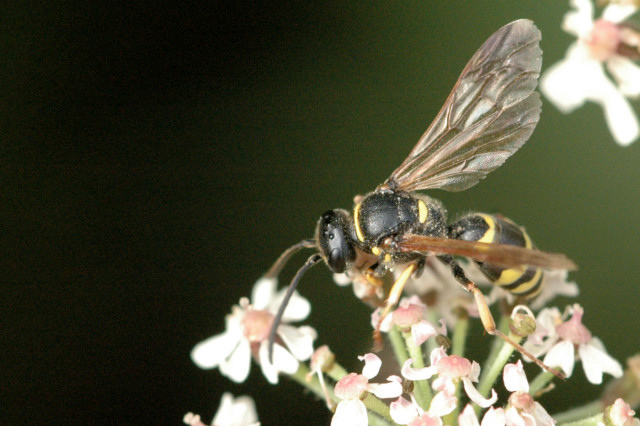
- Gorytes quadrifasciatus

Scientific classification
- Kingdom: Animalia
- Phylum: Arthropoda
- Class: Insecta
- Order: Hymenoptera
- Family: Bembicidae
- Subtribe: Gorytina
- Genus: Gorytes; Latreille, 1805

Type species
- Gorytes quinquecinctus (Fabricius, 1793)

Synonyms
- Euzonia Panzer, 1805; Hoplisus Stephens, 1829; Laevigorytes Lepeletier, 1832; Leiogorytes Lepeletier, 1832; Euspongus Ashmead, 1899; Pseudoplisus Zavadil, 1948; Arpactus R. Bohart, 2000

= Gorytes =

Genus of wasps

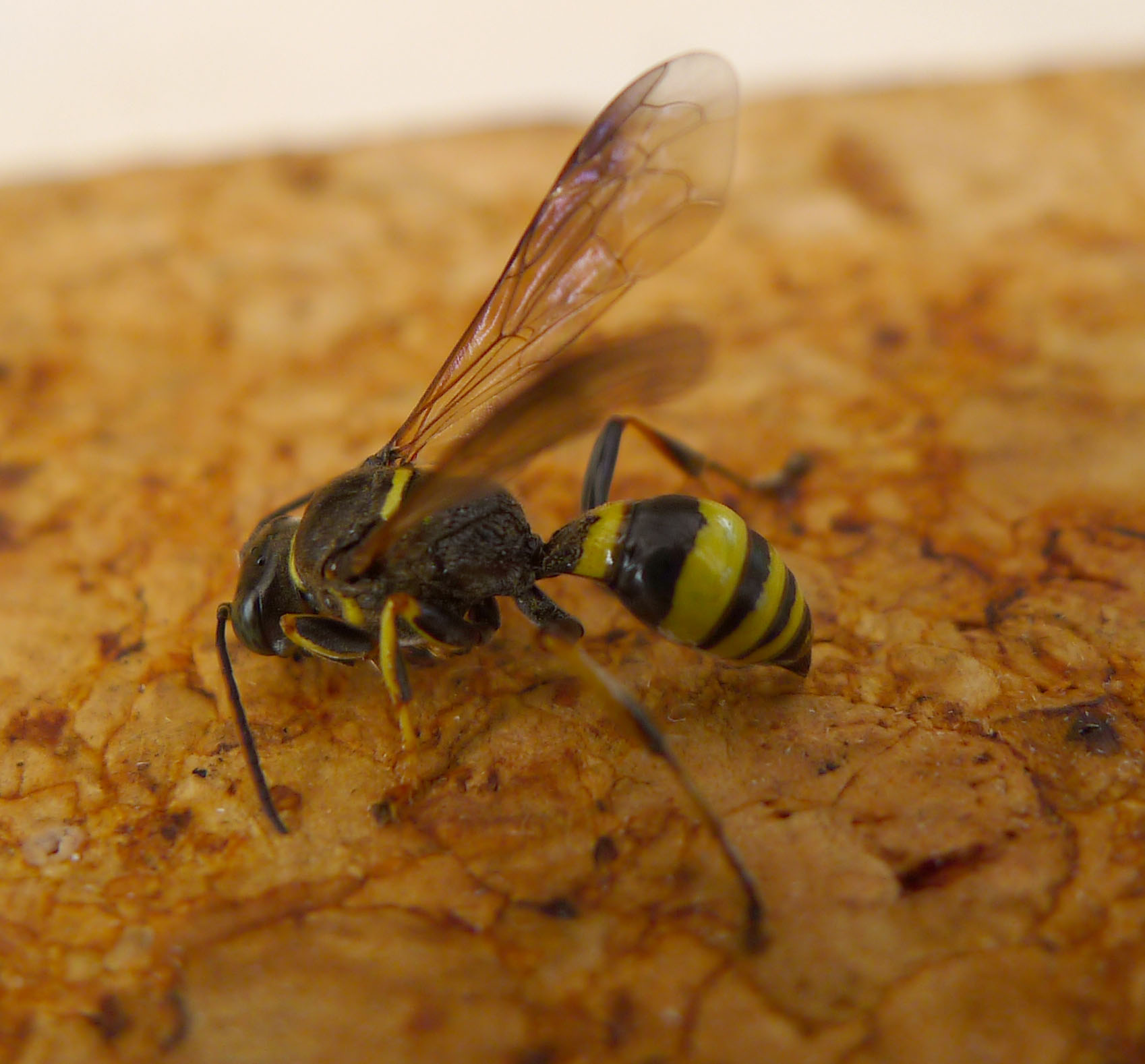
Gorytes laticinctus

Gorytes is a genus of sand wasps in the family Bembicidae. There are at least 70 described species in Gorytes.

== Species ==
These 75 species belong to the genus Gorytes:

- Gorytes abdominalis Cresson, 1865^{i c g}
- Gorytes aequalis Handlirsch, 1888^{i c g}
- Gorytes africanus Mercet, 1905^{i c g}
- Gorytes aino Tsuneki, 1963^{i c g}
- Gorytes albidulus (Lepeletier, 1832)^{i c g}
- Gorytes albilabris (Lepeletier, 1832)^{g}
- Gorytes albosignatus W. Fox, 1892^{i c g}
- Gorytes ambiguus Handlirsch, 1888^{i c g}
- Gorytes angustus (Provancher, 1895)^{i c g}
- Gorytes atricornis Packard, 1867^{i c g b}
- Gorytes atrifrons W. Fox, 1892^{i c g}
- Gorytes butleri (R. Bohart, 1969)^{i c g}
- Gorytes californicus (R. Bohart, 1969)^{i c g}
- Gorytes canaliculatus Packard, 1867^{i c g}
- Gorytes catalinae (R. Bohart, 1969)^{i c g}
- Gorytes claripennis (R. Bohart, 1969)^{i c g}
- Gorytes cochisensis R. Bohart, 1971^{i c g}
- Gorytes deceptor Krombein, 1958^{i c g}
- Gorytes divisus F. Smith, 1856^{i c g}
- Gorytes dorothyae Krombein, 1950^{i c g b}
- Gorytes effugiens Brauns, 1911^{i c g}
- Gorytes erugatus (R. Bohart, 1969)^{i c g}
- Gorytes fallax Handlirsch, 1888^{i c g}
- Gorytes fasciatus W. Fox, 1896^{i c g}
- Gorytes flagellatus R. Bohart, 1971^{i c g}
- Gorytes flavidulus (R. Bohart, 1969)^{i c g}
- Gorytes foveolatus Handlirsch, 1888^{i c g}
- Gorytes guerrero (R. Bohart, 2000)^{i c g}
- Gorytes hadrus (R. Bohart, 1969)^{i c g}
- Gorytes harbinensis Tsuneki, 1967^{c g}
- Gorytes hebraeus de Beaumont, 1953^{i c g}
- Gorytes imperialis (R. Bohart, 1969)^{i c g}
- Gorytes intrudens Nurse, 1903^{i c g}
- Gorytes ishigakiensis Tsuneki, 1982^{i c g}
- Gorytes jonesi (R. Turner, 1920)^{i c g}
- Gorytes kohlii Handlirsch, 1888^{i c g}
- Gorytes kulingensis Yasumatsu, 1943^{i c g}
- Gorytes laticinctus (Lepeletier, 1832)^{i c g}
- Gorytes limbellus R. Bohart, 1971^{i c g}
- Gorytes maculicornis (F. Morawitz, 1889)^{i c g}
- Gorytes mcateei Krombein and R. Bohart, 1962^{i c g}
- Gorytes melpomene (Arnold, 1936)^{i c g}
- Gorytes montanus Cameron, 1890^{i c g}
- Gorytes natalensis F. Smith, 1856^{i c g}
- Gorytes neglectus Handlirsch, 1895^{i c g}
- Gorytes nevadensis W. Fox, 1892^{i c g}
- Gorytes nigricomus (R. Bohart, 1969)^{i c g}
- Gorytes nigrifacies (Mocsáry, 1879)^{i c g}
- Gorytes nyasicus (R. Turner, 1915)^{i c g}
- Gorytes ocellatus (R. Bohart, 1969)^{i c g}
- Gorytes pieli Yasumatsu, 1943^{i c g}
- Gorytes planifrons (Wesmael, 1852)^{i c g}
- Gorytes pleuripunctatus (A. Costa, 1859)^{i c g}
- Gorytes procrustes Handlirsch, 1888^{i c g}
- Gorytes prosopis R. Bohart, 1971^{i c g}
- Gorytes provancheri Handlirsch, 1895^{i c g}
- Gorytes quadrifasciatus (Fabricius, 1804)^{i c g}
- Gorytes quinquecinctus (Fabricius, 1793)^{i c g}
- Gorytes quinquefasciatus (Panzer, 1798)^{i c g}
- Gorytes ranosahae Arnold, 1945^{i c g}
- Gorytes rubiginosus Handlirsch, 1888^{i c g}
- Gorytes rufomaculatus W. Fox, 1896^{i c g}
- Gorytes samiatus (R. Bohart, 1969)^{i c g}
- Gorytes schlettereri Handlirsch, 1893^{i c g}
- Gorytes schmidti Schmid-Egger, 2002^{i c g}
- Gorytes schmiedeknechti Handlirsch, 1888^{i c g}
- Gorytes simillimus F. Smith, 1856^{i c g b}
- Gorytes smithii Cresson, 1880^{i c g}
- Gorytes sulcifrons (A. Costa, 1867)^{i c g}
- Gorytes tanythrix (R. Bohart, 1969)^{i c g}
- Gorytes tobiasi Nemkov, 1990^{i c g}
- Gorytes tricinctus (Pérez, 1905)^{i c g}
- Gorytes umatillae R. Bohart, 1971^{i c g}
- Gorytes venustus Cresson, 1865^{i c g}
- Gorytes willcoxi (Ohl, 2009)^{i c g b}

Data sources: i = ITIS, c = Catalogue of Life, g = GBIF, b = Bugguide.net
