= Bicyrtes variegatus =

Scientific classification
- Domain: Eukaryota
- Kingdom: Animalia
- Phylum: Arthropoda
- Class: Insecta
- Order: Hymenoptera
- Family: Bembicidae
- Tribe: Bembicini
- Subtribe: Bembicina
- Genus: Bicyrtes
- Species: B. variegatus

Binomial name
- Bicyrtes variegatus (Olivier, 1789)

Synonyms
- Bembex guiana Cameron, 1912; Bembex variegata Olivier, 1789; Dumonela sericea (Spinola, 1851); Monedula dissecta Dahlbom, 1844; Monedula sericea Spinola, 1851

Species of wasp

Bicyrtes variegatus is a species of sand wasp in the family Bembicidae. It is found in Central America and South America.
