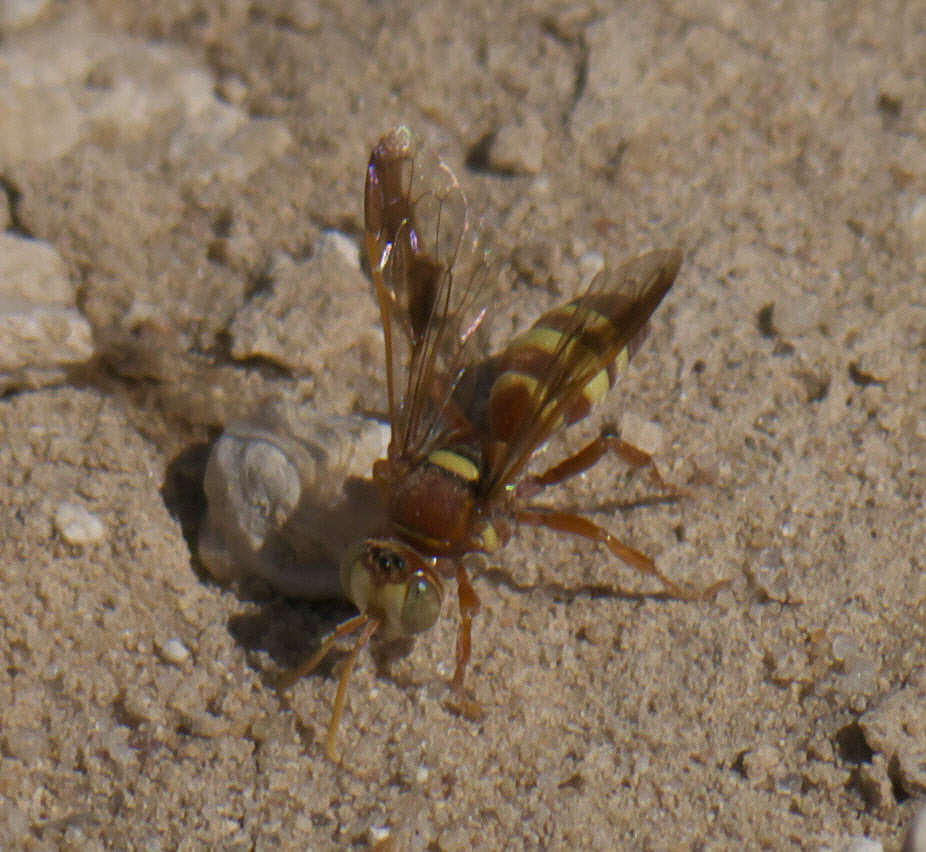
- Hoplisoides tricolor

Scientific classification
- Domain: Eukaryota
- Kingdom: Animalia
- Phylum: Arthropoda
- Class: Insecta
- Order: Hymenoptera
- Family: Bembicidae
- Subtribe: Gorytina
- Genus: Hoplisoides; Gribodo, 1884

Synonyms
- Icuma Cameron, 1905

= Hoplisoides =

Genus of wasps

Hoplisoides is a genus of sand wasps in the family Bembicidae. There are at least 70 described species in Hoplisoides.

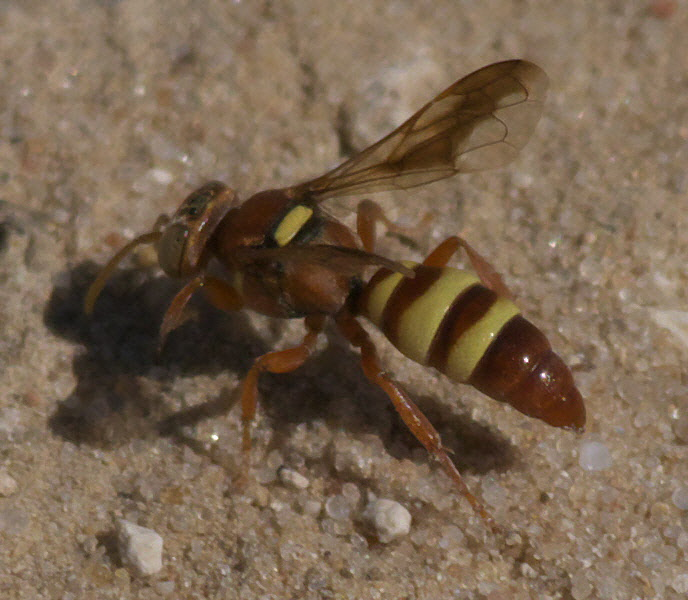
Hoplisoides tricolor

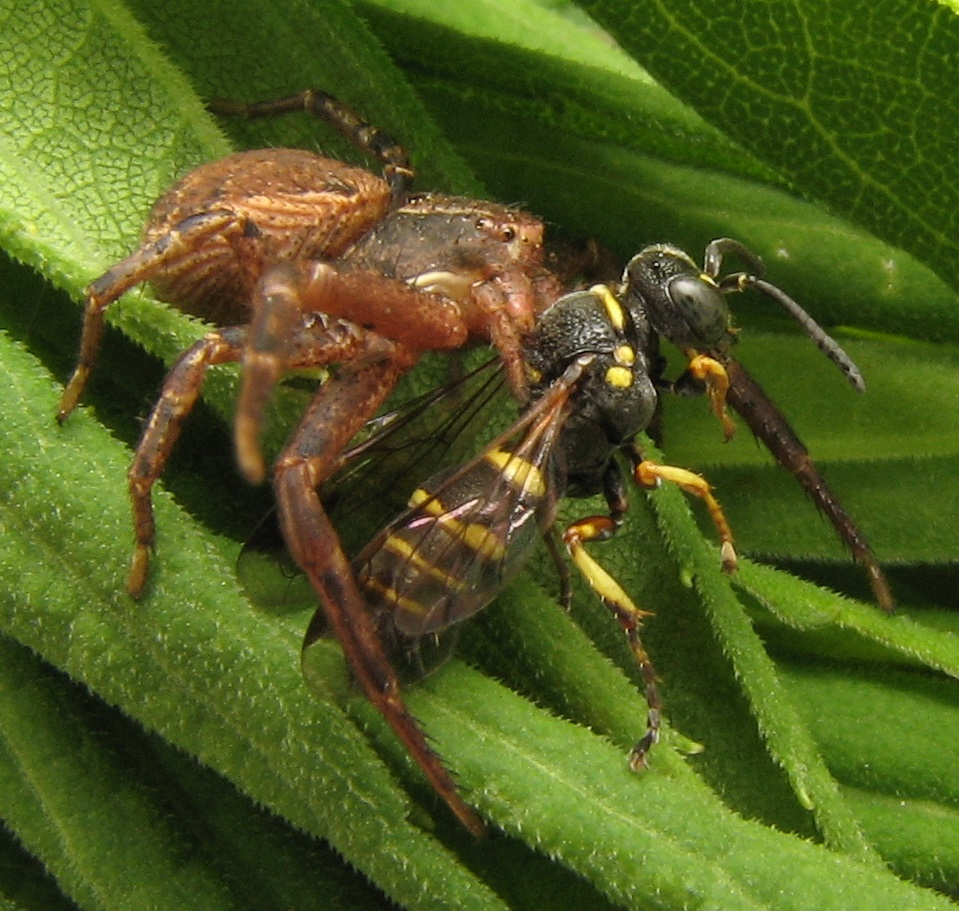
Hoplisoides, prey of Xysticus, crab spider

== Species ==
- Hoplisoides aglaia (Handlirsch, 1895)
- Hoplisoides alaya (Pate, 1947)
- Hoplisoides arispilos R. Bohart, 2000
- Hoplisoides ater (Gmelin, 1790)
- Hoplisoides azuae R. Bohart, 2000
- Hoplisoides bandraensis (Giner Marí, 1945)
- Hoplisoides basutorum (Arnold, 1958)
- Hoplisoides bipustulatus (Arnold, 1945)
- Hoplisoides boranensis (Guiglia, 1939)
- Hoplisoides braunsii (Handlirsch, 1901)
- Hoplisoides calliope (Arnold, 1936)
- Hoplisoides capitatus (Nurse, 1902)
- Hoplisoides carinatus R. Bohart, 1968
- Hoplisoides cazieri R. Bohart, 1968
- Hoplisoides confertus (W. Fox, 1896)
- Hoplisoides confusus (Dutt, 1921)
- Hoplisoides costalis (Cresson, 1873)
- Hoplisoides craverii (A. Costa, 1867)
- Hoplisoides dentatus (W. Fox, 1893)
- Hoplisoides denticulatus (Packard, 1867)
- Hoplisoides diversus (W. Fox, 1896)
- Hoplisoides dominicanus R. Bohart, 2000
- Hoplisoides elotae R. Bohart, 1997
- Hoplisoides emeryi (Gribodo, 1894)
- Hoplisoides eurynome (Arnold, 1955)
- Hoplisoides feae (Handlirsch, 1895)
- Hoplisoides ferrugineus (Spinola, 1839)
- Hoplisoides floridicus R. Bohart, 1968
- Hoplisoides fuscus (Taschenberg, 1875)
- Hoplisoides gazagnairei (Handlirsch, 1893)
- Hoplisoides glabratus R. Bohart, 1968
- Hoplisoides hamatus (Handlirsch, 1888)
- Hoplisoides helvolus R. Bohart, 2000
- Hoplisoides homonymus (W. Schulz, 1906)
- Hoplisoides iheringii (Handlirsch, 1893)
- Hoplisoides impiger (Bingham, 1897)
- Hoplisoides insularis (Cresson, 1865)
- Hoplisoides intricans Gribodo, 1884
- Hoplisoides iridipennis (F. Smith, 1856)
- Hoplisoides jaumei (Alayo Dalmau, 1969)
- Hoplisoides jentinki (Handlirsch, 1895)
- Hoplisoides jibacoa (Alayo Dalmau, 1969)
- Hoplisoides jordani (Handlirsch, 1895)
- Hoplisoides latifrons (Spinola, 1808)
- Hoplisoides liberiensis (Arnold, 1936)
- Hoplisoides manjikuli Tsuneki, 1963
- Hoplisoides marshalli (R. Turner, 1915)
- Hoplisoides mendozanus (Brèthes, 1913)
- Hoplisoides metapleura R. Bohart, 2000
- Hoplisoides montivagus (Arnold, 1951)
- Hoplisoides mweruensis (Arnold, 1952)
- Hoplisoides nebulosus (Packard, 1867)
- Hoplisoides niger R. Bohart, 1997
- Hoplisoides nigripes R. Bohart, 2000
- Hoplisoides notialis R. Bohart, 2000
- Hoplisoides orientalis (Handlirsch, 1888)
- Hoplisoides ovatus R. Bohart, 2000
- Hoplisoides parkeri R. Bohart, 1997
- Hoplisoides peruvicus R. Bohart, 2000
- Hoplisoides philippinicus Tsuneki, 1992
- Hoplisoides pictus (F. Smith, 1856)
- Hoplisoides placidus (F. Smith, 1856)
- Hoplisoides projectus R. Bohart, 1968
- Hoplisoides punctifrons (Cameron, 1890)
- Hoplisoides punctuosus (Eversmann, 1849)
- Hoplisoides pygidialis (W. Fox, 1896)
- Hoplisoides quedenfeldti (Handlirsch, 1895)
- Hoplisoides rasilis R. Bohart, 2000
- Hoplisoides remotus (R. Turner, 1917)
- Hoplisoides ruficeps R. Bohart, 2000
- Hoplisoides schubotzii (Arnold, 1932)
- Hoplisoides semipunctatus (Taschenberg, 1875)
- Hoplisoides splendidulus (Bradley, 1920)
- Hoplisoides thalia (Handlirsch, 1895)
- Hoplisoides tricolor (Cresson, 1868)
- Hoplisoides umtalicus (Arnold, 1929)
- Hoplisoides vespoides (F. Smith, 1873)
- Hoplisoides whitei (Cameron, 1905)
- Hoplisoides xerophilus Alayo Dalmau, 1976
