= Gorytes willcoxi =

Scientific classification
- Domain: Eukaryota
- Kingdom: Animalia
- Phylum: Arthropoda
- Class: Insecta
- Order: Hymenoptera
- Family: Bembicidae
- Tribe: Bembicini
- Subtribe: Gorytina
- Genus: Gorytes
- Species: G. willcoxi

Binomial name
- Gorytes willcoxi (Ohl, 2009)

Synonyms
- Pseudoplisus willcoxi Ohl, 2009

Species of wasp

Gorytes willcoxi is a species of sand wasp in the family Bembicidae. It is found in North America.
