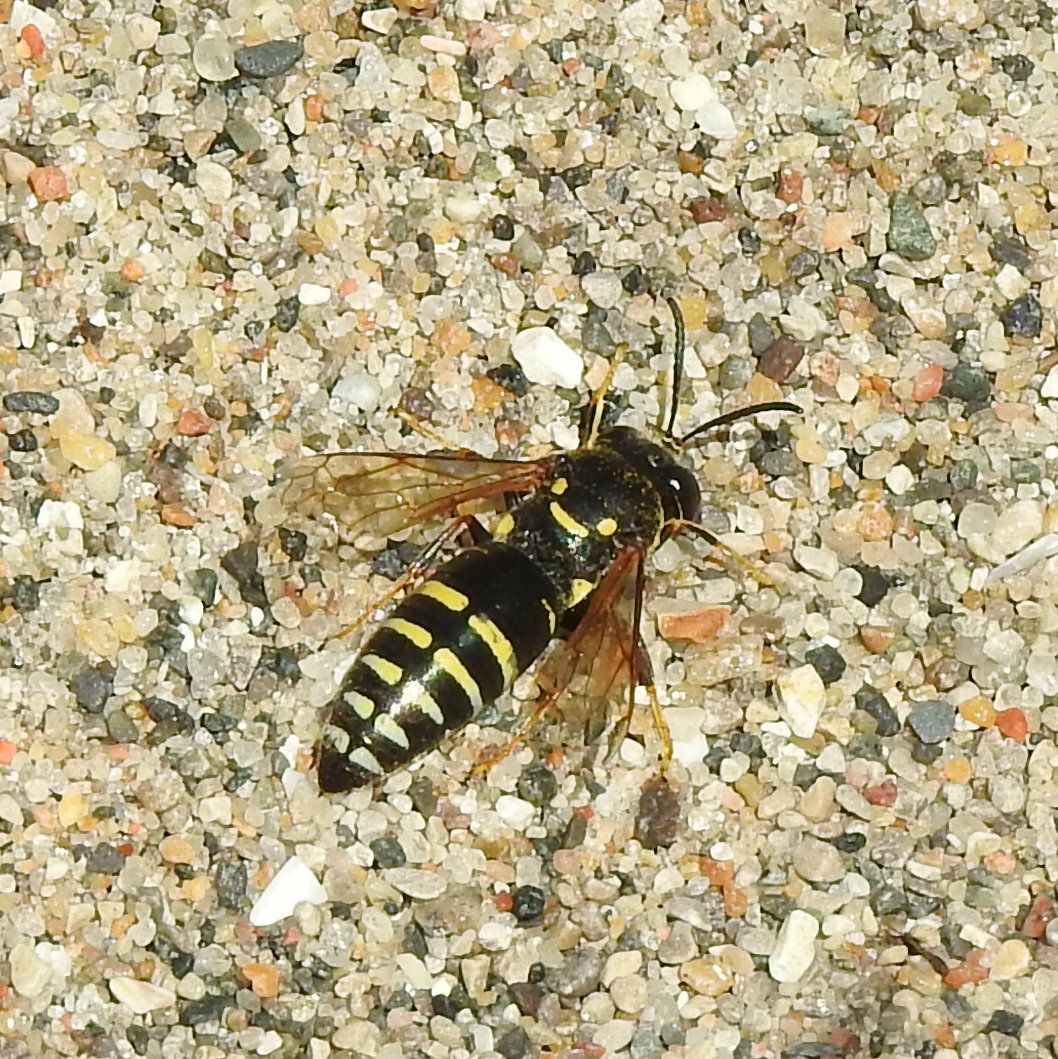
- Bicyrtes ventralis, Canada

Scientific classification
- Domain: Eukaryota
- Kingdom: Animalia
- Phylum: Arthropoda
- Class: Insecta
- Order: Hymenoptera
- Family: Bembicidae
- Genus: Bicyrtes
- Species: B. ventralis

Binomial name
- Bicyrtes ventralis (Say, 1824)

Synonyms
- Bembidula meliloti Say, 1824; Bembidula parata Lepeletier, 1845; Bicyrtes parata (Lepeletier, 1845); Bicyrtes servillii (Lepeletier, 1845); Larra servillii Provancher, 1888; Monedula parata (Provancher, 1888); Monedula ventralis (Provancher, 1888); Stizus servillii Rohwer, 1908

= Bicyrtes ventralis =

Species of wasp

Bicyrtes ventralis is a species of sand wasp in the family Bembicidae. It is found in Central America and North America.
