= Bicyrtes capnopterus =

Scientific classification
- Domain: Eukaryota
- Kingdom: Animalia
- Phylum: Arthropoda
- Class: Insecta
- Order: Hymenoptera
- Family: Bembicidae
- Tribe: Bembicini
- Subtribe: Bembicina
- Genus: Bicyrtes
- Species: B. capnopterus

Binomial name
- Bicyrtes capnopterus (Handlirsch, 1889)

Synonyms
- Bembidula capnoptera Handlirsch, 1889; Bembidula capnoptera mesillensis Cockerell, 1899; Bicyrtes annulatus J. Parker, 1917; Bicyrtes mesillensis (Cockerell, 1899); Bicyrtes tristis C. Fox, 1923

Species of wasp

Bicyrtes capnopterus is a species of sand wasp in the family Bembicidae. It is found in Central America and North America.
