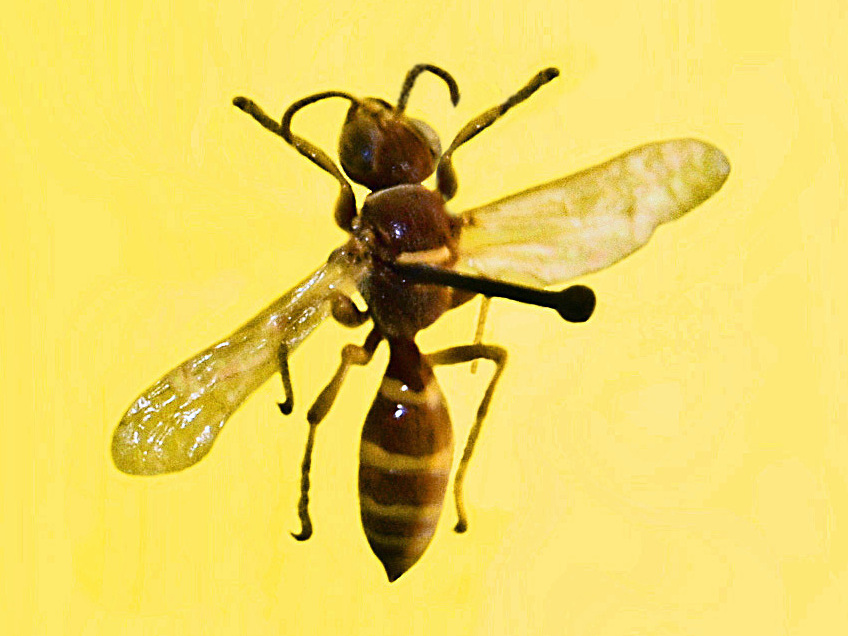
- Gorytes quinquecinctus. Museum specimen

Scientific classification
- Domain: Eukaryota
- Kingdom: Animalia
- Phylum: Arthropoda
- Class: Insecta
- Order: Hymenoptera
- Family: Bembicidae
- Genus: Gorytes
- Species: G. quinquecinctus

Binomial name
- Gorytes quinquecinctus (Fabricius, 1793)

= Gorytes quinquecinctus =

Species of wasp

Gorytes quinquecinctus is a species of sand wasps belonging to the family Bembicidae.

== Subspecies ==
- Gorytes quinquecinctus quinquecinctus (Fabricius, 1793)
- Gorytes quinquecinctus sinuatus (A. Costa, 1869)

== Description ==
Gorytes quinquecinctus can reach a length of about 10 millimetres (0.39 in). These small wasps are black with yellow markings. Mandibles are black, while clypeus is black with yellow spots.

They nest in the soil. The preys are commonly represented by small leafhoppers (Auchenorrhyncha).

== Distribution and habitat ==
This species is present in Europe, Russia, Ukraine, Turkey, Azerbaijan, Kyrgyzstan, Uzbekistan, Kazakhstan, Korea, Mongolia, Algeria, Morocco and Tunisia. These wasps can be found in dry grasslands.
