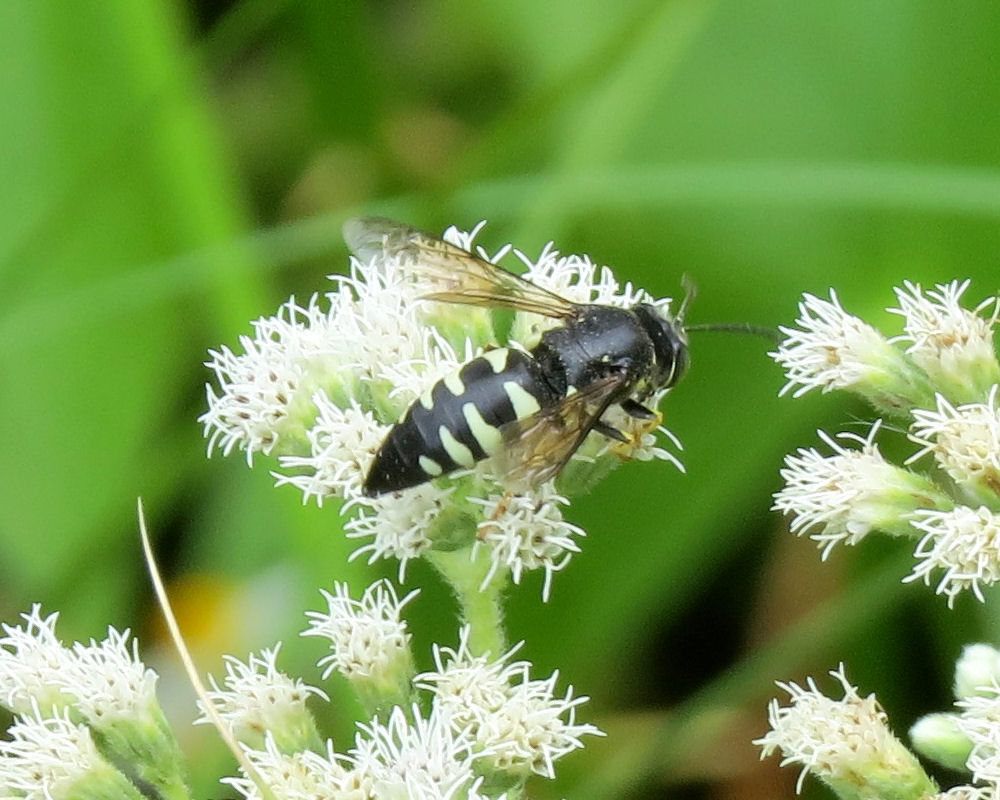
- Bicyrtes quadrifasciatus

Scientific classification
- Domain: Eukaryota
- Kingdom: Animalia
- Phylum: Arthropoda
- Class: Insecta
- Order: Hymenoptera
- Family: Bembicidae
- Subtribe: Bembicina
- Genus: Bicyrtes; Lepeletier, 1845

Type species
- Bicyrtes ventralis (Say, 1824)

Species
- ~30 species; see text

= Bicyrtes =

Genus of wasps

Bicyrtes is a genus of large, often brightly coloured predatory sand wasps. Many species in this genus provision their nests with paralyzed Pentatomidae, while other species make use of Reduviidae and Coreidae instead.

This genus gets its name ("two-humped") from the two noticeable projections arising from the rear of the mesosoma (middle segment).

== Selected species ==
- Bicyrtes affinis (Cameron, 1897)
- Bicyrtes capnopterus (Handlirsch, 1889)
- Bicyrtes diodontus (Handlirsch, 1889)
- Bicyrtes discisus (Taschenberg, 1870)
- Bicyrtes fodiens (Handlirsch, 1889)
- Bicyrtes insidiatrix (Handlirsch, 1889)
- Bicyrtes quadrifasciatus (Say, 1824)
- Bicyrtes spinosus (Fabricius, 1794)
- Bicyrtes variegatus (Olivier, 1789)
- Bicyrtes viduatus (Handlirsch, 1889)
- Bicyrtes ventralis (Say, 1824)
