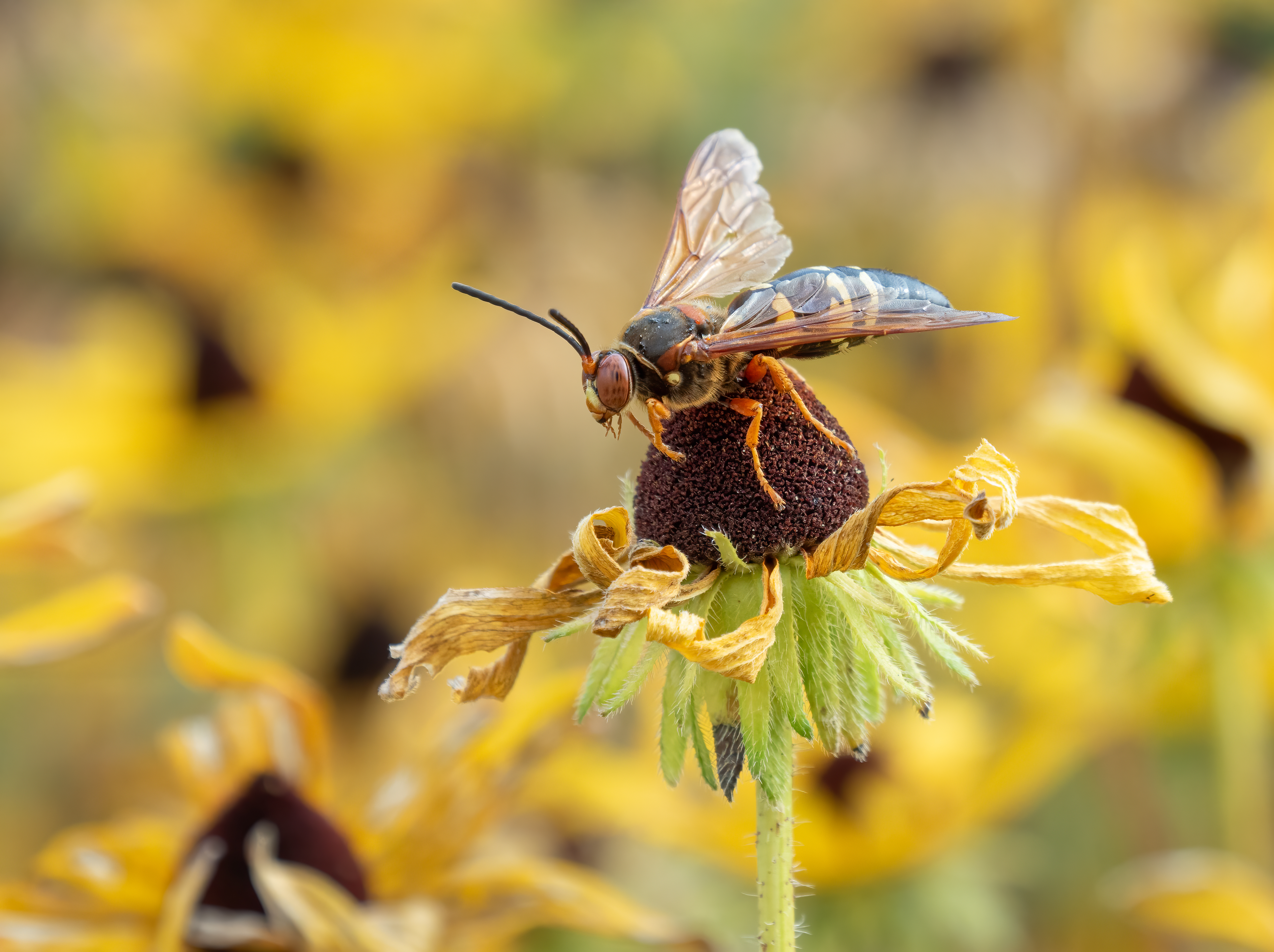
- Eastern cicada killer

Scientific classification
- Kingdom: Animalia
- Phylum: Arthropoda
- Clade: Pancrustacea
- Class: Insecta
- Order: Hymenoptera
- Family: Bembicidae
- Tribe: Bembicini
- Subtribe: Spheciina
- Genus: Sphecius; Dahlbom, 1844

Type species
- Sphecius speciosus (Drury, 1773)

Species
- Some 21, see text

Synonyms
- Hogardia Dufour, 1841 (Unav.); Hogardia Lepeletier, 1845; Sphecienus Patton, 1879; Nothosphecius Pate, 1936

= Sphecius =

Cicada killer wasps

Genus of wasps

Cicada killer wasps (genus Sphecius) are large, solitary, ground-dwelling, predatory wasps. They are so named because they hunt cicadas and provision their nests with them, after stinging and paralyzing them. Twenty-one species worldwide are recognized. The highest diversity occurs in the region between North Africa and Central Asia.

In North America, the term "cicada killer wasp" usually refers to the most well-known species, the eastern cicada killer (S. speciosus). A few other related genera also are sometimes referred to as "cicada killers", e.g. Liogorytes in South America and Exeirus in Australia.

The use of cicadas as prey is in keeping with the typical behavior of the tribe Bembicini, which tend to specialize on various members of the Cicadomorpha as prey items.

== Species ==
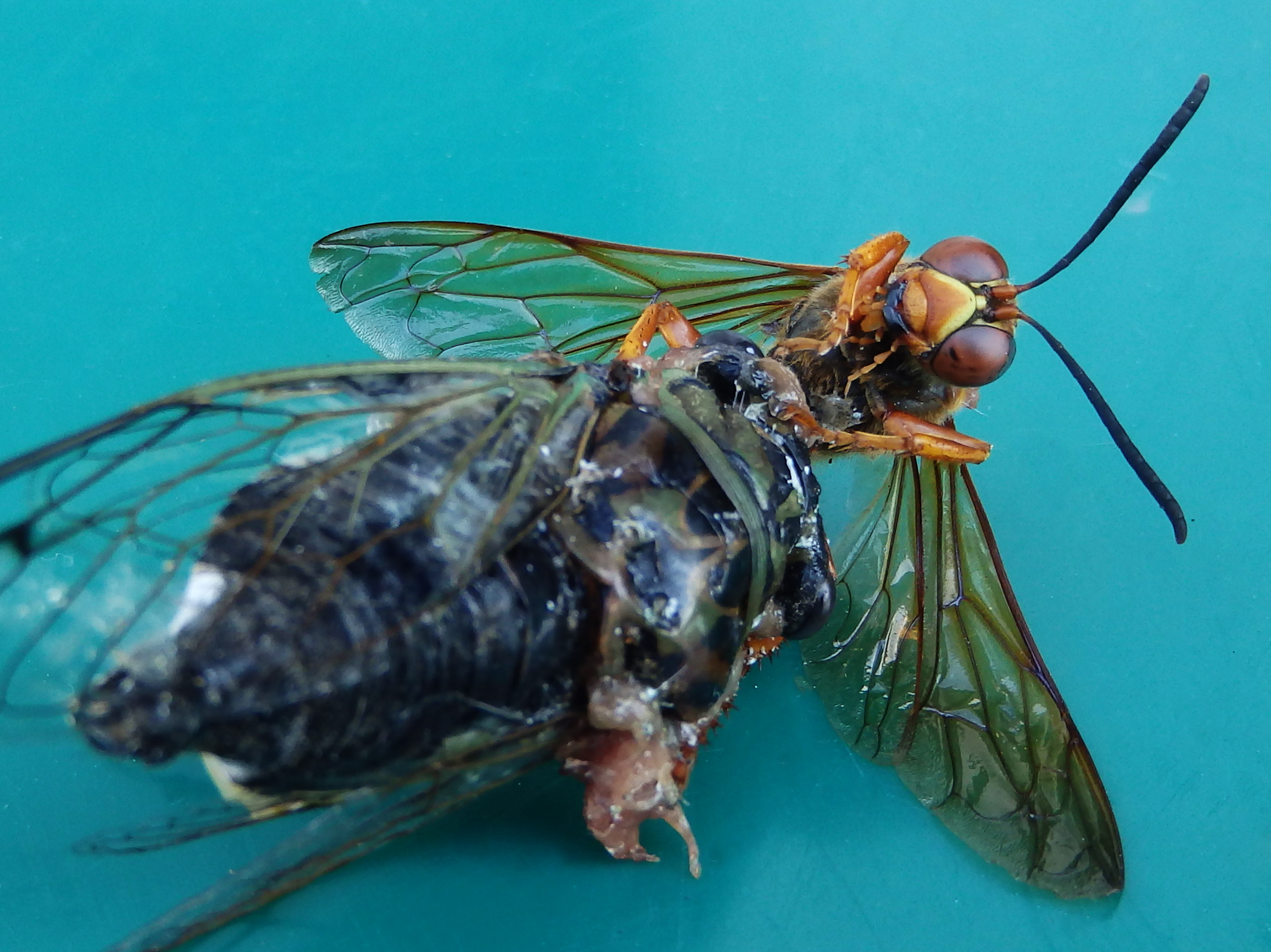
Sphecius speciosus with prey (Fitchburg, Massachusetts, US)

This list of species is probably complete as of March 31, 2009. It has been adapted from the Catalog of ''Sphecius'' species (California Academy of Sciences). Notable subspecies are also given.

More recently, it has been suspected that the western cicada killer (S. grandis) represents more than one species. Also, some evidence suggests that either the eastern cicada killer (S. speciosus) has a subspecies or closely related species that mimics the Pacific cicada killer (S. convallis). Alternatively, when they were already well distinct species, significant hybridization has occurred between them, though not enough to fully overcome their reproductive isolation.

- Sphecius antennatus (Klug, 1845) (Southern and Eastern Europe, Middle East, Central Asia)
- Sphecius citrinus Arnold, 1929 (South Africa)
- Sphecius claripennis Morice, 1911 (North Africa)
- Sphecius conicus (Germar, 1817) (Balkans, Kazakhstan, Turkey, Greece)
  - Sphecius conicus creticus de Beaumont, 1965 (Crete)
  - Sphecius conicus syriacus (Klug, 1845) (Syria to China)
- Sphecius convallis Patton, 1879 – Pacific cicada killer (Mexico: Baja California, Chihuahua, Jalisco, Nuevo León, Querétaro, San Luis Potosí, Sinaloa, Sonora; USA: Arizona, California, Colorado, Idaho, New Mexico, Nevada, Oregon, Texas, Utah, Washington)
- Sphecius grandidieri (de Saussure, 1887) (Madagascar)
- Sphecius grandis (Say, 1823) – western cicada killer (Costa Rica; Mexico: Baja California, Chihuahua, Jalisco, Nuevo León, Tamaulipas, Yucatán; Nicaragua; USA: Arizona, California, Colorado, Idaho, Kansas, Nebraska, New Mexico, Nevada, Oklahoma, Oregon, Texas, Utah, Washington)
- Sphecius hemixanthopterus Morice, 1911 (Algeria)
- Sphecius hogardii (Latreille, 1806) – Caribbean cicada killer (Bahamas, Cayman Islands, Cuba, Dominican Republic, Jamaica, USA: southern Florida)
  - Sphecius hogardii bahamas Krombein, 1953 (Bahama Islands: Bimini)
- Sphecius intermedius Handlirsch, 1895 (Algeria)
- Sphecius lutescens (Radoszkowski, 1877) (Central Asia)
- Sphecius malayanus Handlirsch, 1895 (Indonesia: Timor, Sumbava)
- Sphecius milleri R.Turner, 1915 (Zambia)
  - Sphecius milleri aurantiacus Arnold, 1940 (Ethiopia)
- Sphecius nigricornis (Dufour, 1838) (Southern and Eastern Europe, North Africa)
- Sphecius pectoralis (F.Smith, 1856) (Australia)
- Sphecius persa Gussakovskij, 1933 (Iran, Afghanistan)
- Sphecius quartinae (Gribodo, 1884) (Guinea, Somalia)
- Sphecius schulthessi Roth, 1951 (North Africa)
- Sphecius speciosus (Drury, 1773) – Eastern cicada killer (Central and North America: Honduras to Ontario, Canada)
- Sphecius spectabilis (Taschenberg, 1875) – South American cicada killer (Brazil, Argentina)
- Sphecius uljanini (Radoszkowski, 1877) (Kazakhstan, Turkmenistan, Iran)
