= Psammaecius =

Scientific classification
- Kingdom: Animalia
- Phylum: Arthropoda
- Class: Insecta
- Order: Hymenoptera
- Family: Bembicidae
- Subtribe: Gorytina
- Genus: Psammaecius; Lepeletier, 1832

Genus of wasps

Psammaecius is a genus of wasps belonging to the family Bembicidae.

The species of this genus are found in Europe and North America.

Species:

- Psammaecius austeni Turner, 1919
- Psammaecius eremorum de Beaumont, 1952
