= Liogorytes =

Scientific classification
- Domain: Eukaryota
- Kingdom: Animalia
- Phylum: Arthropoda
- Class: Insecta
- Order: Hymenoptera
- Family: Bembicidae
- Subtribe: Gorytina
- Genus: Liogorytes; R. Bohart, 1967

Type species
- Liogorytes catarinae R. Bohart, 1967

Species
- 11 described species

Genus of wasps

The genus Liogorytes comprises a group of large, solitary, ground-dwelling, predatory South American wasps which hunt cicadas as prey. It is related to the more common genus of cicada killers, Sphecius.
