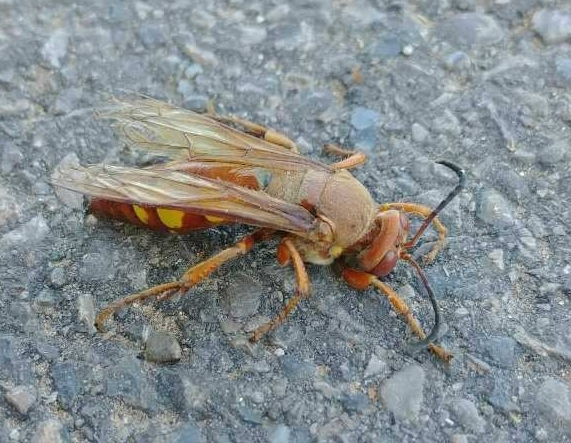

Scientific classification
- Kingdom: Animalia
- Phylum: Arthropoda
- Class: Insecta
- Order: Hymenoptera
- Family: Bembicidae
- Tribe: Bembicini
- Subtribe: Spheciina
- Genus: Sphecius
- Species: S. convallis

Binomial name
- Sphecius convallis Patton, 1879

Synonyms
- Sphecius raptor Handlirsch, 1889; Sphecius speciosus convallis Patton, 1879

= Sphecius convallis =

Species of wasp

Sphecius convallis, the Pacific cicada killer, is a species of sand wasp in the family Bembicidae. It is found in Central America and North America.
