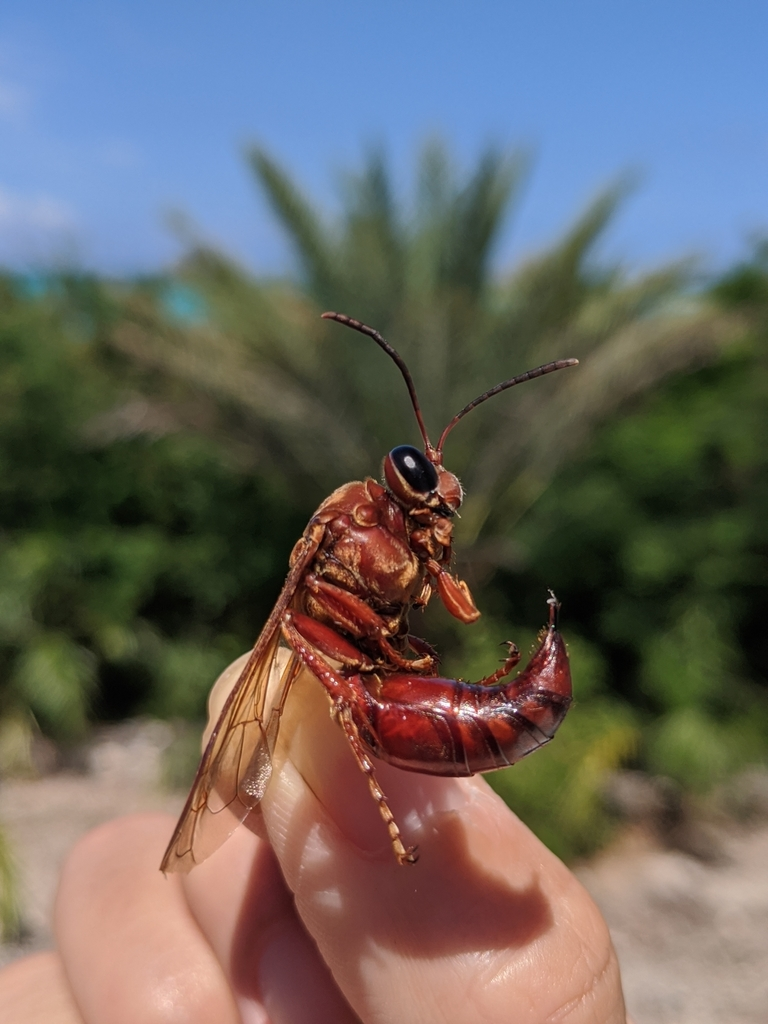

Scientific classification
- Kingdom: Animalia
- Phylum: Arthropoda
- Clade: Pancrustacea
- Class: Insecta
- Order: Hymenoptera
- Family: Bembicidae
- Genus: Sphecius
- Species: S. hogardii

Binomial name
- Sphecius hogardii (Latreille, 1806)

Synonyms
- Hogardia rufescens Lepeletier, 1845; Stizus hogardii Latreille, 1806

= Sphecius hogardii =

Species of wasp

Sphecius hogardii, the Caribbean cicada killer, is a species of sand wasp in the family Bembicidae. It is found in the Caribbean and North America.

== Subspecies ==
These two subspecies belong to the species Sphecius hogardii:

- Sphecius hogardii bahamas (Krombein, 1953)
- Sphecius hogardii hogardii (Latreille, 1806)
