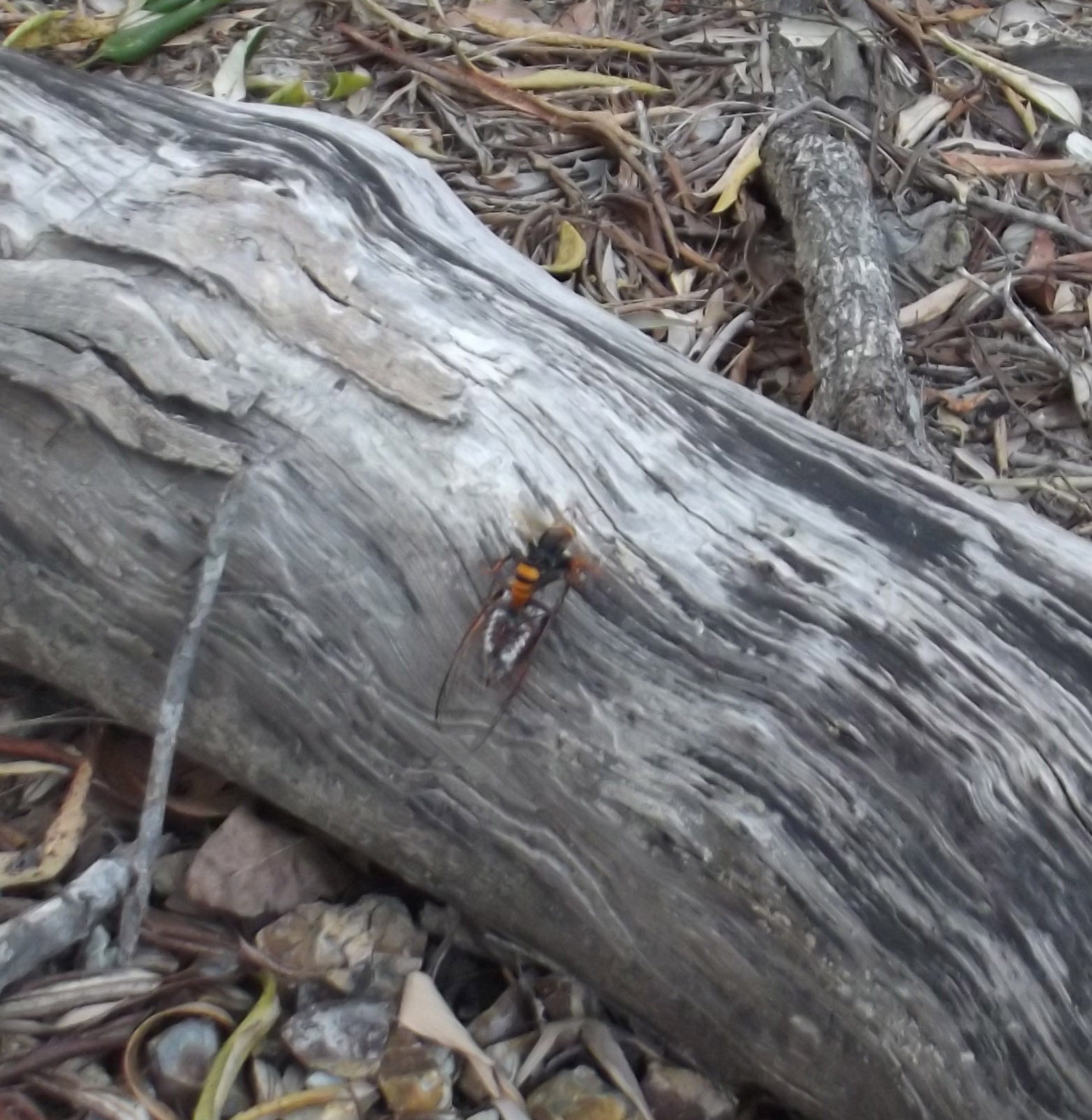
- Exeirus lateritius (Cicada-killer wasp), Fraser Coast, Queensland, Australia

Scientific classification
- Domain: Eukaryota
- Kingdom: Animalia
- Phylum: Arthropoda
- Class: Insecta
- Order: Hymenoptera
- Family: Bembicidae
- Genus: Exeirus
- Species: E. lateritius

Binomial name
- Exeirus lateritius (Shuckard, 1838)

= Exeirus =

Australian cicada killer wasp

Genus of wasps

The Australian cicada killer wasp, Exeirus lateritius, the sole member of the genus Exeirus, is a large, solitary, ground-dwelling, predatory wasp. It is related to the more common genus of cicada killers, Sphecius. In Australia, E. lateritius hunts over 200 species of cicada.

== Habitat ==
The wasps occur in warm, dry areas where there are enough trees to support cicadas, such as the Murray-Darling basin, the south-east coast of the Australian mainland including Sydney, and Tasmania.

== Predation method ==
Exeirus lateritius stings and paralyses cicadas high in the trees, making them drop to the ground, from where the wasp moves them to its burrow, pushing with its hind legs, sometimes over a distance of a hundred meters. The paralysed cicada is placed on one of many shelves in a "catacomb", to form the food-stock for the wasp grub which grows out of the egg deposited there., sometimes as deep as 60 cm underground
