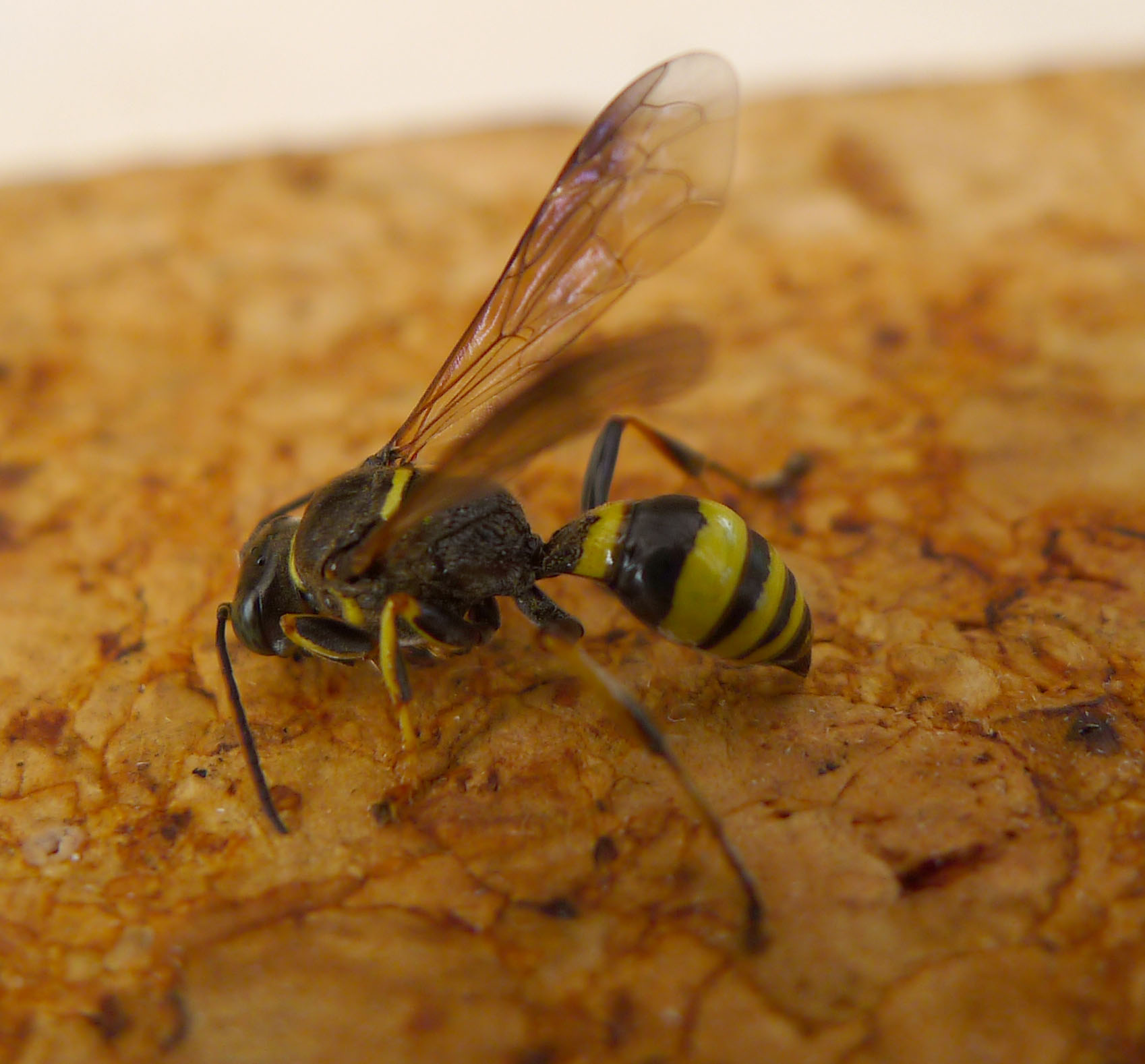
- Gorytes laticinctus

Scientific classification
- Kingdom: Animalia
- Phylum: Arthropoda
- Class: Insecta
- Order: Hymenoptera
- Family: Bembicidae
- Tribe: Bembicini
- Subtribe: Gorytina; Lepeletier, 1845

= Gorytina =

Subtribe of wasps

Gorytina is a subtribe of sand wasps in the family Bembicidae. There are at least 20 genera and 370 described species in Gorytina.

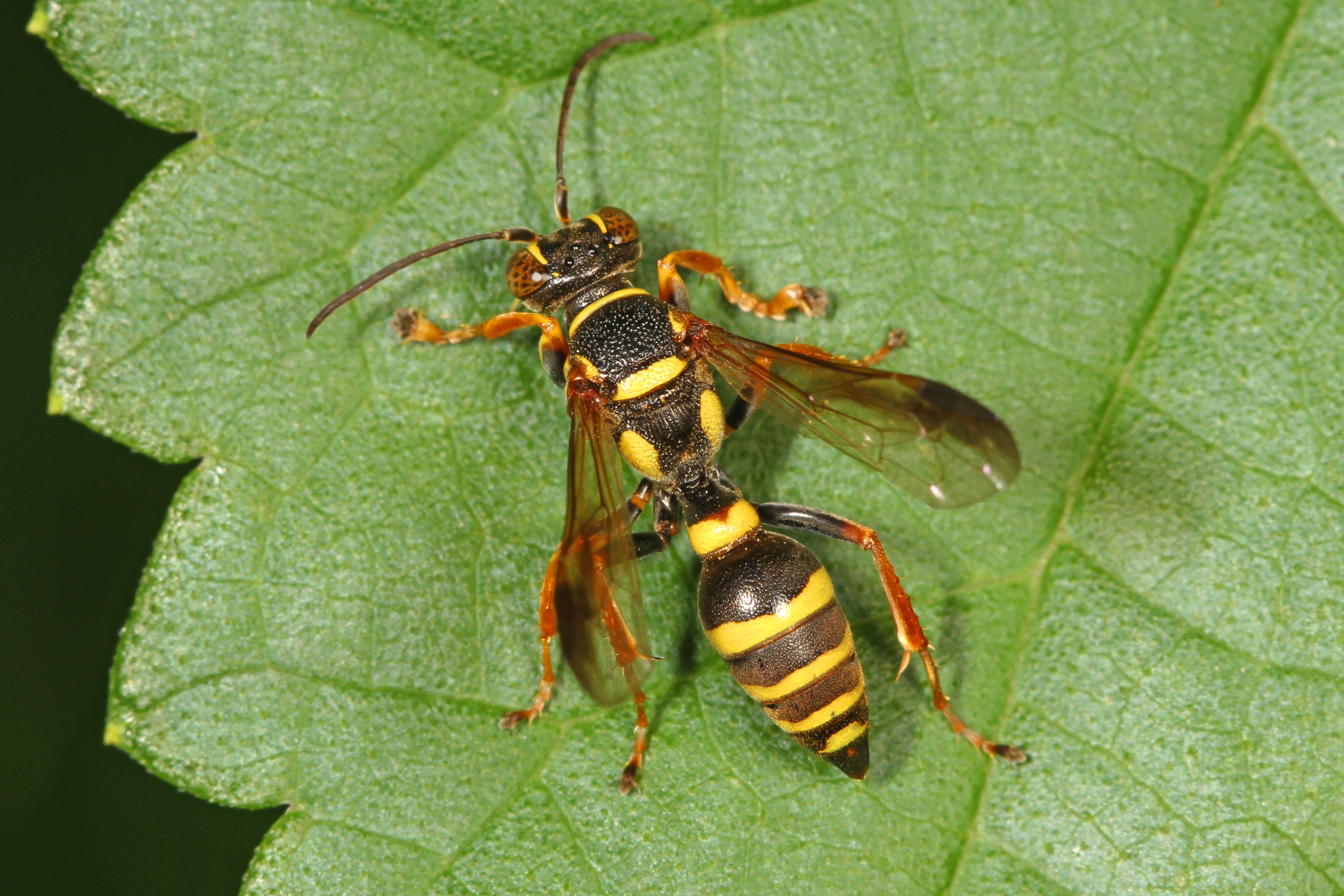
Psammaletes mexicanus

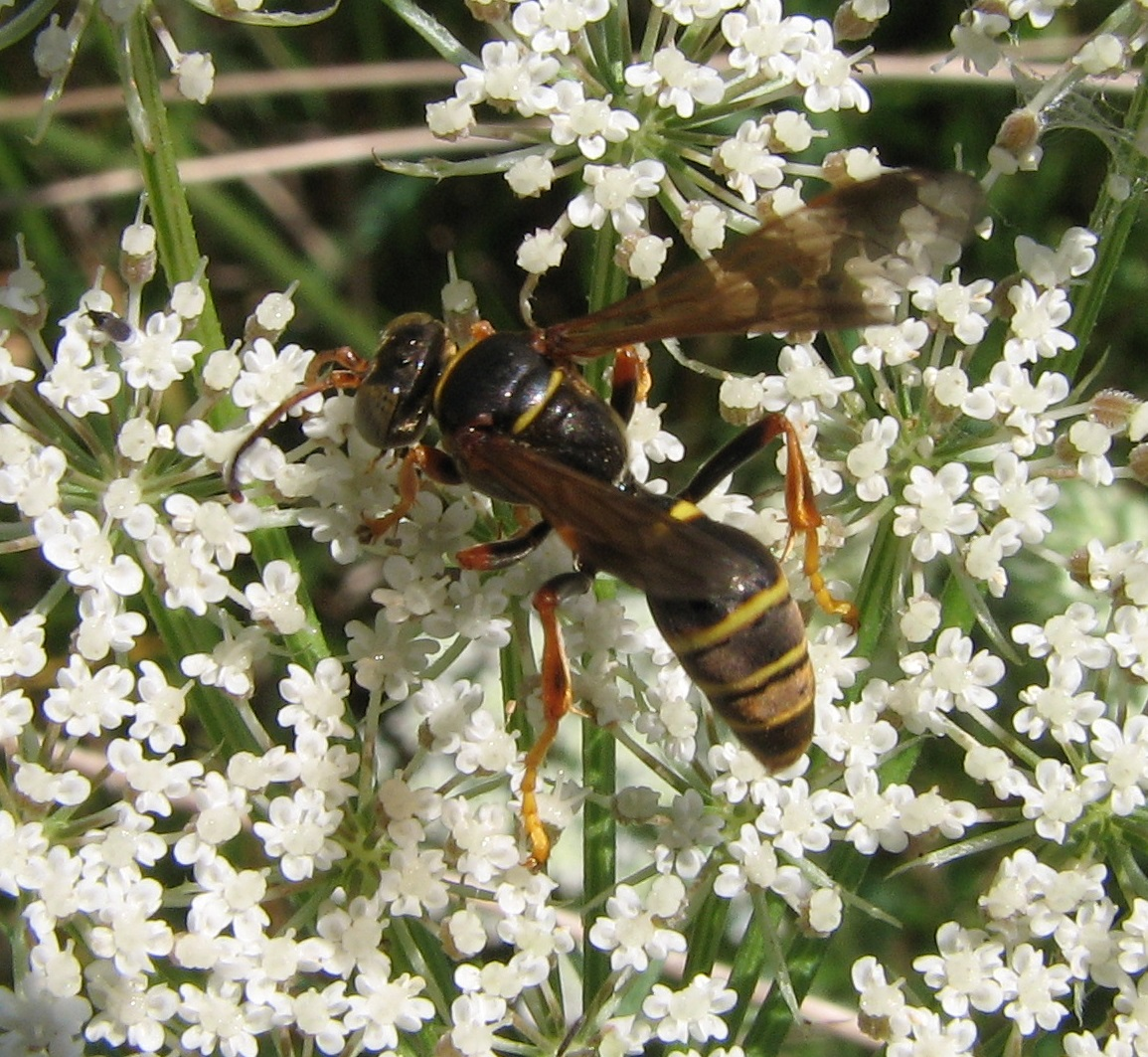
Saygorytes phaleratus

== Genera ==
These 26 genera belong to the subtribe Gorytina:

- Afrogorytes Menke, 1967^{i c g}
- Allogorytes R. Bohart, 2000^{i c g}
- Arigorytes Rohwer, 1912^{i c g}
- Aroliagorytes R. Bohart, 2000^{i c g}
- Austrogorytes R. Bohart, 1967^{i c g}
- Eogorytes R. Bohart, 1976^{i c g}
- Epigorytes R. Bohart, 2000^{i c g}
- Gorytes Latreille, 1805^{i c g b}
- Hapalomellinus Ashmead, 1899^{i c g}
- Harpactostigma Ashmead, 1899^{i c g}
- Harpactus Shuckard, 1837^{i c g b}
- Hoplisoides Gribodo, 1884^{i c g b}
- Lestiphorus Lepeletier, 1832^{i c g b}
- Leurogorytes R. Bohart, 2000^{i c g}
- Liogorytes R. Bohart, 1967^{i c g}
- Megistommum W. Schulz, 1906^{i c g}
- Oryttus Spinola, 1836^{i c g}
- Psammaecius Lepeletier, 1832^{i c g}
- Psammaletes Pate, 1936^{i c g b}
- Sagenista R. Bohart, 1967^{i c g}
- Saygorytes Nemkov, 2007^{i c g b}
- Stenogorytes Schrottky, 1911^{i c g}
- Stethogorytes R. Bohart, 2000^{i c g}
- Tretogorytes R. Bohart, 2000^{i c g}
- Trichogorytes Rohwer, 1912^{i c g}
- Xerogorytes R. Bohart, 1976^{i c g}

Data sources: i = ITIS, c = Catalogue of Life, g = GBIF, b = Bugguide.net
