= Sand wasp =

A sand wasp is a wasp of one of the following groups:

- Ammophila, a narrow-waisted genus of hunting wasps that often nests in sandy soil
- Bembicini, a tribe of crabronid wasps that burrow in sandy soil
