= Horse Guards =

Horse Guards or horse guards can refer to:

- The Household Cavalry, a British Army corps:
  - Troops of the Horse Guards Regiment of the British Army from 1658 to 1788
  - The Royal Horse Guards, which is now part of the Blues and Royals
- The Governor General's Horse Guards, the Household Cavalry regiment of the Canadian Army
- Horse Guards (building), a building in Whitehall, London, formerly the headquarters of the British Army
  - Horse Guards Parade, the parade ground behind the building where the Trooping the Colour ceremony is held annually
  - Horse Guards Road, the road between the parade ground and St. James's Park
- Horse guard wasp, a North American sand wasp which eats horse flies
