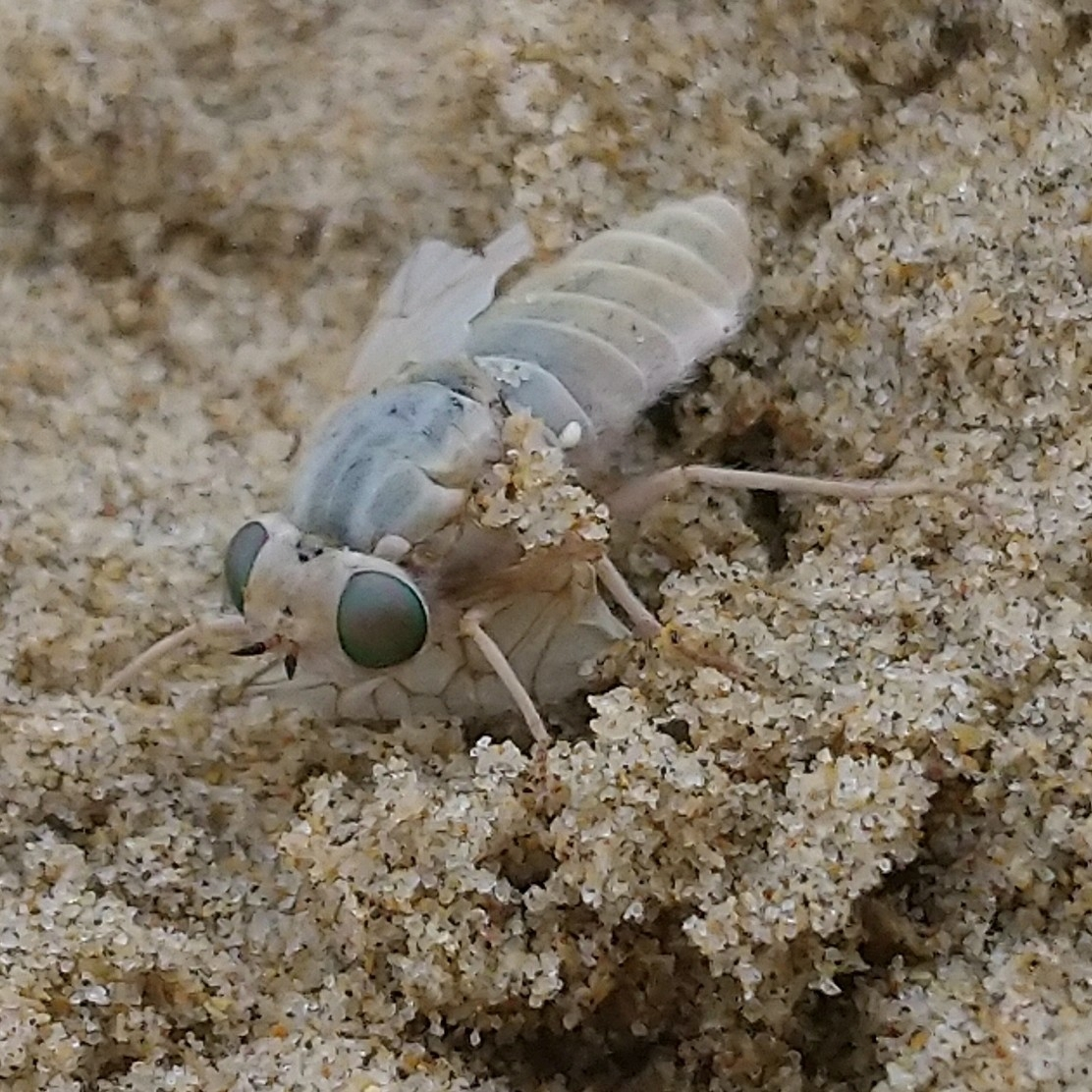

Scientific classification
- Kingdom: Animalia
- Phylum: Arthropoda
- Clade: Pancrustacea
- Class: Insecta
- Order: Diptera
- Family: Tabanidae
- Subfamily: Adersiinae
- Tribe: Adersiini
- Genus: Adersia
- Species: A. oestroides

Binomial name
- Adersia oestroides (Karsch, 1888)

Synonyms
- Silvius oestroides Karsch, 1888

= Adersia oestroides =

Species of insect

Adersia oestroides is a species of horse flies in the family Tabanidae.

== Distribution ==
It is found in Eastern and Southern Africa, including Zanzibar.
