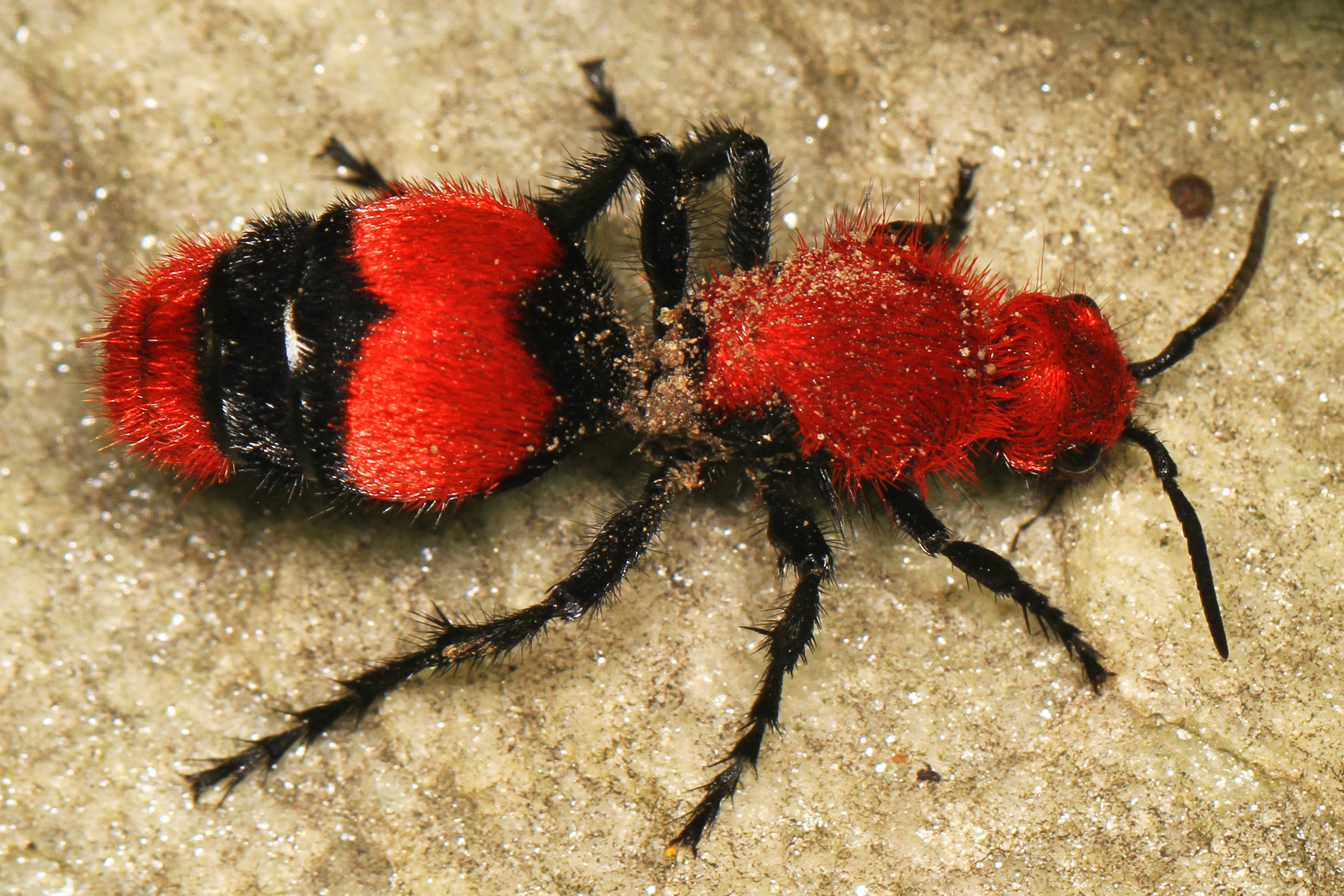
- female
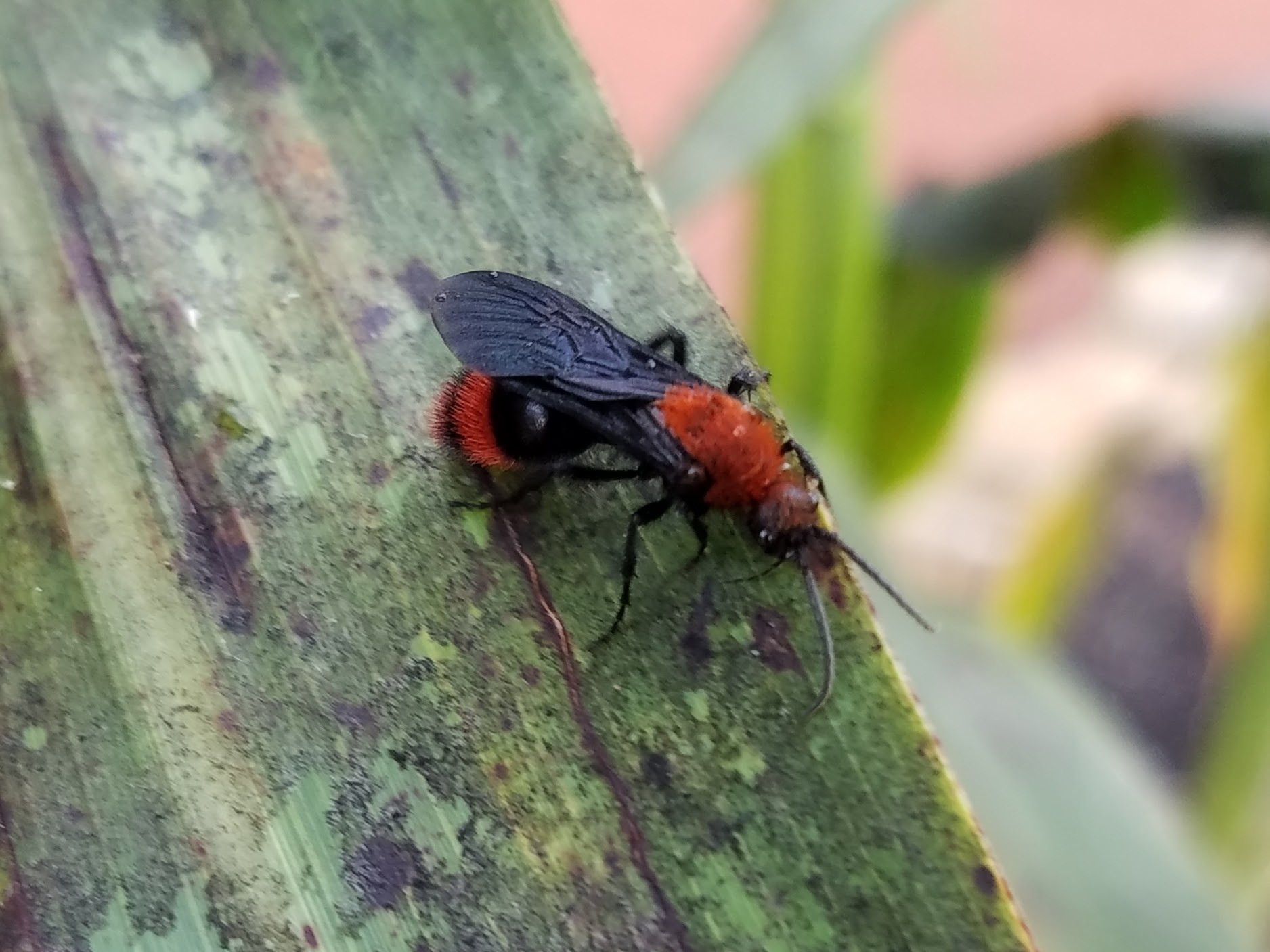
- male

Scientific classification
- Kingdom: Animalia
- Phylum: Arthropoda
- Clade: Pancrustacea
- Class: Insecta
- Order: Hymenoptera
- Family: Mutillidae
- Genus: Dasymutilla
- Species: D. occidentalis

Binomial name
- Dasymutilla occidentalis (Linnaeus, 1758)

Synonyms
- Mutilla occidentalis Linnaeus, 1758

= Dasymutilla occidentalis =

Species of wasp

Dasymutilla occidentalis (red velvet ant, eastern velvet ant, cow ant or cow killer) is a species of parasitoid wasp that ranges from Connecticut to Kansas in the north and Florida to Texas in the south. Adults are mostly seen in the summer months.

The eastern velvet ant is the largest of the velvet ant species in the eastern United States, attaining an approximate length of 1.9 cm (0.75 in). Adults display aposematic coloration, consisting of black overall coloring with an orange-red pattern on the dorsal surface of the thorax and abdomen.

== Characteristics and description ==
Commonly mistaken for an ant because of its appearance and its common name, it is a parasitoid wasp species in which the females are wingless, as is true for all females of Mutillidae. It can be recognized by its distinctive coloring, black with bright red on the upper side of the head, thorax, and abdomen. They are quick-moving and often take a defensive posture when threatened. Unlike the females, males have dark, translucent wings and do not possess a stinger.

== Ecology ==
Dasymutilla occidentalis plays an ecological role as parasites and prey.

=== Defense ===
Dasymutilla species have multiple defensive strategies, but are best known for their extremely painful sting, ranked 3 out of 4 on the Schmidt's sting pain index, earning them the nickname of "cow killer". Cow killer defenses include a thickened exoskeleton, the ability to run fast and evasively, warning coloration, stridulatory warning sounds, a chemical secretion, and venom. In particular, an abundant venom peptide found in D.occidentalis venom is Do6a, which induces nociception in Drosophila larvae. Both sexes make a squeaking noise (stridulation) to warn potential predators (another form of aposematism in females, and automimicry in males). When stridulating, velvet ants rub their abdominal segments together in a rapid fashion. This is different than stridulation seen in insects such as crickets, in which the leg structures are rubbed against the abdomen.

D. occidentalis and related species are well known for their Mullerian mimicry. Mullerian mimicry occurs when species with pre-existing defenses adopt similar colorations and patterns to increase the fitness of all species involved. North American velvet ant species comprise one of the most intricate Mullerian mimicry rings in the natural world, being divided into eight separate rings of mimicry. Their behavior and coloring has been used to study how aposematic coloration works in the wild.

=== Reproduction and life cycle ===
Like most wasp species, velvet ants live solitary lives. Males take to the air to detect pheromones released by females. Males will fly towards female stridulation sounds as well. Once a receptive female is located, the male will carry the female in his mandibles and move her to a place he deems "safe" to mate. These mating spaces are often shaded and away from potential mating competitors. Both males and females stridulate during the mating process. Once the mating process is finished, the female begins looking for eggs and larvae of host species. Females are believed to mate only once in their lifetime.

After mating, females seek out the brood cells of Eastern cicada killers and horse guard wasps as well as other large ground-nesting members of Crabronidae, where they sneak into the nest and deposit an egg onto a host larva. The egg quickly hatches into a white, legless grub, which consumes the host larva and goes through several larval stages prior to pupation. Pupation typically takes 23 days.
