= Do6a =

Velvet Ant toxin

Identifiers
3D model (JSmol)	Interactive image
- InChI: InChI=1S/C47H84N12O13/c1-13-26(10)37(46(71)52-27(11)38(63)54-31(20-60)42(67)53-30(18-23(4)5)41(66)57-35(24(6)7)44(69)50-19-34(49)62)58-45(70)36(25(8)9)56-39(64)28(12)51-43(68)33-15-14-16-59(33)47(72)32(21-61)55-40(65)29(48)17-22(2)3/h22-33,35-37,60-61H,13-21,48H2,1-12H3,(H2,49,62)(H,50,69)(H,51,68)(H,52,71)(H,53,67)(H,54,63)(H,55,65)(H,56,64)(H,57,66)(H,58,70)/t26-,27-,28-,29-,30-,31-,32-,33-,35-,36-,37-/m0/s1 Key: FVDXPCYYCWNWFB-QTVOXQNYSA-N
- SMILES: N[C@@]([H])(CC(C)C)C(=O)N[C@@]([H])(CO)C(=O)N1[C@@]([H])(CCC1)C(=O)N[C@@]([H])(C)C(=O)N[C@@]([H])(C(C)C)C(=O)N[C@@]([H])([C@]([H])(CC)C)C(=O)N[C@@]([H])(C)C(=O)N[C@@]([H])(CO)C(=O)N[C@@]([H])(CC(C)C)C(=O)N[C@@]([H])(C(C)C)C(=O)NCC(=O)N

Properties
Chemical formula	C_{47}H_{84}N_{12}O_{13}
Molar mass	1025.260 g·mol^{−1}
- Except where otherwise noted, data are given for materials in their standard state (at 25 °C [77 °F], 100 kPa). Infobox references

Do6a Peptide Information
Genus	Mutillidae
Species	Dasymutilla occidentalis
Sequence	LSPAVIASLVG–NH_{2}
EC_{50} (μM)	113

Do6a is a venom peptide found in the venom of the Velvet ant (Mutillidae). It targets Pickpocket/Balboa ion channels in class IV dendritic arborizing (cIV da) neurons in larvae of fruit flies (Drosophila melanogaster). Do6a has been shown to also activate nociceptors in praying mantis (Mantodea).

== Etymology ==
The nomenclature for the Do6a venom peptide splits into two components: "Do" refers to the specific Velvet ant species it is extracted from: the Dasymutilla occidentalis. "6a" refers to the specific family and isoform of the Do peptide. Other venom peptides originating from different velvet ant species exist that follow similar nomenclature, such as Dk5a in Dasymutilla klugii.

== Sources ==
Do6a is a venom peptide synthesized by D. occidentalis species of velvet ant, also known as red velvet ant, cow killer, cow ant, and eastern velvet ant. It is postulated to be the most abundant venom peptide in D. occidentalis venom, being 1-3 orders of magnitude more abundant than other Drosophila targeting components; Do10a, Do12a, and Do13a. Despite the title of "ant", the Dasymutilla genus belongs to the Mutillidae wasp family. D. occidentalis do not kill cows, this misleading title comes from their painful sting, which ranks on level 2-3 of 4 on the Schmidt pain index. While the coloration across the genus Dasymutilla varies from white to bright red, an adult D. occidentalis specifically exhibits a distinctive red-and-black aposematic pattern associated with Müllerian mimicry. Males do not possess a stinger but have black wings.

Velvet ants are both parasites and prey. Females lay their eggs in nests of other solitary wasp species. Due to their parasitic reproduction cycle, velvet ants require strong defensive strategies. As such, their painful sting is a vital defense.

== Chemistry ==
Do6a is the most abundant peptide in D. occidentalis venom with an EC50 of 113 nM which is much lower than that of other peptides in the same venom (for example, Do10a has an EC50 of 75 μM). The sequence of Do6a shares similarities in both amino acid composition and length to a known endogenous pain signaling peptide; Vulnusin. Vulnusin, which is present in Drosophila larvae, signals the larvae to initiate puncture-induced rolling as a defense strategy for moving away from parasitoid wasps. Compared to Do6a, Vulnusin has a significantly lower EC50, making it more potent. Nevertheless, there are speculations that velvet ants evolved venom peptides similar to vulnusin in order to target the same ion channel complex.

Despite being the most potent and concentrated peptide in red velvet ant venom, Do6a alone does not appear to give rise to any considerable nocifensive responses in mice, such as paw licking. Even when administered at concentrations up to 10,000 higher than the EC50 for larval nociceptor activation, its effects in mice remain negligible. This indicates that the mode of action underlying Do6a-induced nociception differs between mammals and insects.

== Target ==
Do6a primarily targets Pickpocket/Balboa (Ppk/Bba or Ppk1/Ppk26) ion channels that are evenly distributed on the dendrites of class IV dendritic arborizing (cIV da) neurons in the peripheral nervous system of fruit fly larvae. cIV da neurons are responsible specifically for nociception from mechanical stimuli and heat, unlike cI, cII cIII that respond to other sensory input, like proprioception or gentle touch. These neurons have highly complex dendritic trees and blocking their synaptic output significantly reduces behavioral nociceptive responses (e.g. rolling) in larvae. Do6a appears to target exclusively insect nociceptors, likely due to the parasitic reproduction cycle of the species requiring good protection against other insects. Other peptides in the venom (e.g. Do10a and Do13a) affect pain receptors in mammals. Expression of both Ppk and Bba forming a heteromeric channel complex in cIV da neurons are necessary for nociception from Do6a. Ppk/Bba belong to Degenerin/Epithelial (DEG/ENaC) protein family and respond specifically to mechanical nociception and not noxious heat. Gating of these channels is still not entirely understood. While their activation upon harsh mechanical pressure may suggest a mechanosensitive nature of these channels, peptides like Do6a and Vulnusin have been shown to activate Ppk1/Ppk26 without a presence of a mechanical stimulus, pointing towards ligand-gating instead. Moreover, other undetermined proteins may be a part of Ppk1/Ppk26 channel complex, as co-expression of exclusively Ppk and Bba together does not produce mechanosensitive currents. Even very diluted concentrations of velvet ant venom (1:8,192) activate cIV da nociceptors through Ppk1/Ppk26, meaning that the key venom peptide is highly potent and affinitive.

== Mode of action ==
The exact activation mechanism of Ppk1/Ppk26 ion channels in the presence of Do6a is unknown; however, it likely compares to the mode of action of endogenous peptide Vulnusin due to their similarity in structure. Vulnusin binds to Ppk/Bba channels upon mechanical injury, yet administration of this peptide independently still results in channel activation and nociceptive rolling in Drosophila larvae. This could mean that a wound in larvae tissue allows Vulnusin, normally located above the epidermal layer, to reach its receptors below epidermal cells. Do6a, delivered to Ppk/Bba receptors through a mechanical puncture of the tissue from the velvet ant sting, could elicit its response through a similar mechanism.

Since Ppk1/Ppk26 ion channels are homologous to Acid-sensing ion channels (ASICs) in vertebrates, they are likely to be permeable to cations, however, the exact ion type that passes through these channels upon activation has not been determined.

== Toxicity ==
Activation of Ppk1/Ppk26 induces rolling — typical nociceptive behavior in Drosophila larvae. However, no information is available regarding the lethal dose of Do6a toxin.

One sting of a velvet ant is not lethal to praying mantis or mouse but is deadly for the honeybee. It is important to remember that velvet ant venom comprises other toxins apart from Do6a.
