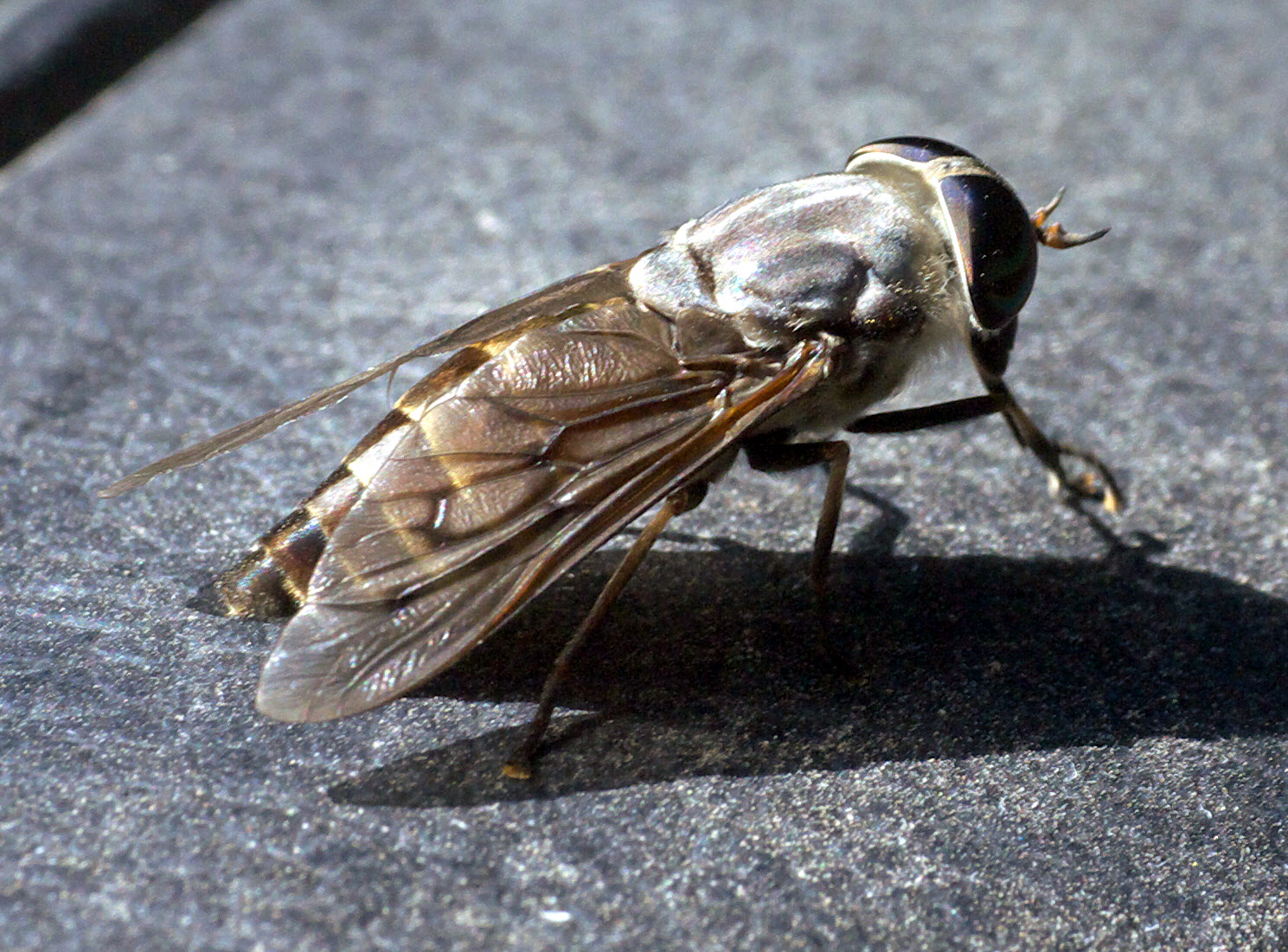

Scientific classification
- Kingdom: Animalia
- Phylum: Arthropoda
- Clade: Pancrustacea
- Class: Insecta
- Order: Diptera
- Family: Tabanidae
- Subfamily: Tabaninae
- Tribe: Tabanini
- Genus: Tabanus
- Species: T. sulcifrons

Binomial name
- Tabanus sulcifrons Macquart, 1855

Synonyms
- Tabanus fulcifrons Macquart, 1855; Tabanus exul Osten Sacken, 1878; Tabanus tectus Osten Sacken, 1876

= Tabanus sulcifrons =

Species of fly

Tabanus sulcifrons is a species of horse fly in the family Tabanidae, widely distributed throughout the eastern half of the United States and adjacent regions of southern Canada.

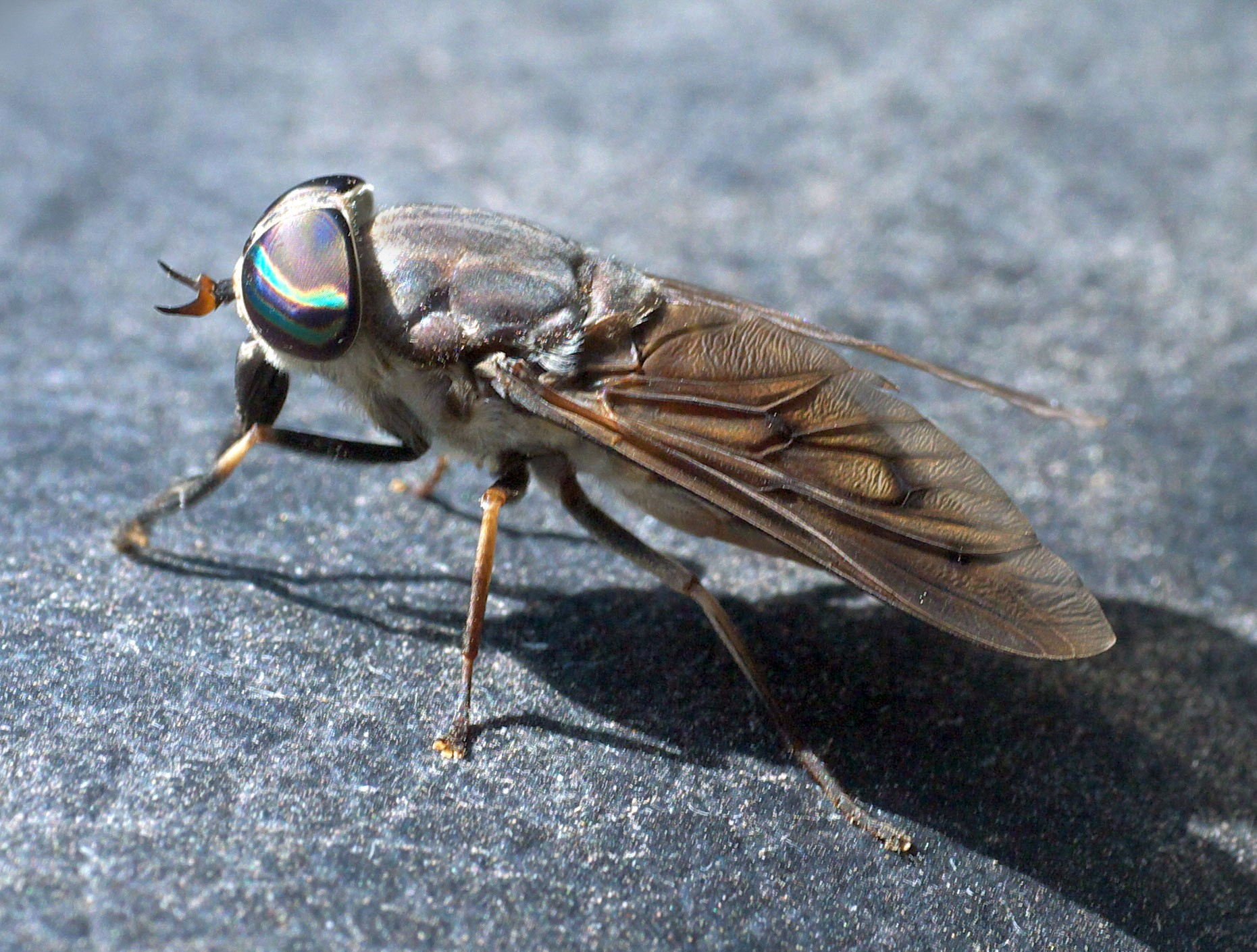

== Subspecies ==
These two subspecies belong to the species Tabanus sulcifrons:

- Tabanus sulcifrons sulcifrons Macquart, 1855
- Tabanus sulcifrons variegatus Fabricius, 1805
