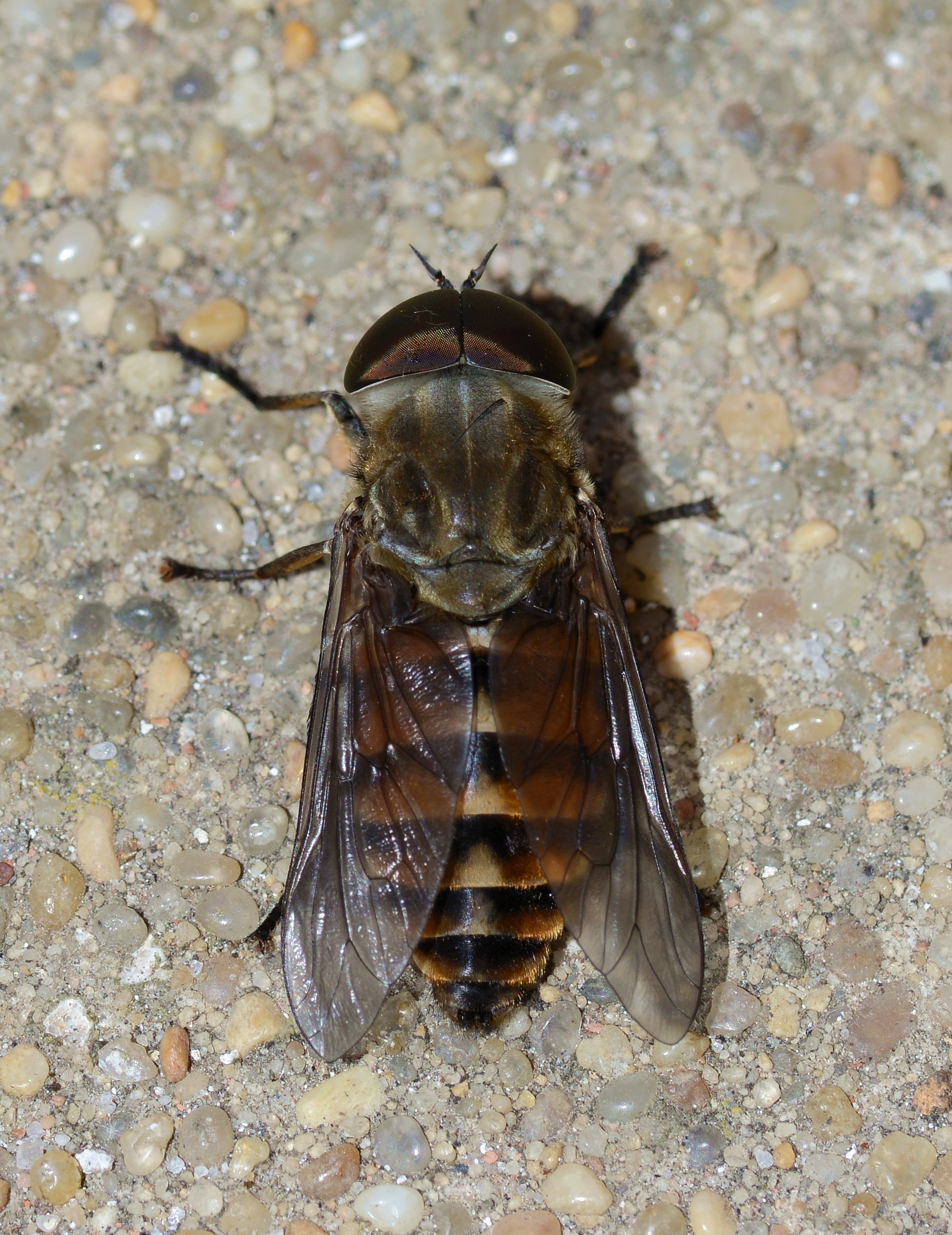
- Male Tabanus eggeri, Portugal

Scientific classification
- Kingdom: Animalia
- Phylum: Arthropoda
- Clade: Pancrustacea
- Class: Insecta
- Order: Diptera
- Family: Tabanidae
- Subfamily: Tabaninae
- Tribe: Tabanini
- Genus: Tabanus
- Species: T. eggeri

Binomial name
- Tabanus eggeri (Schiner, 1868)

Synonyms
- Tabanus intermedius Egger, 1859

= Tabanus eggeri =

Species of fly

Tabanus eggeri is a Mediterranean species of biting horse-fly, found in southern France, Italy, Albania, Croatia, Herzegovina, Bulgaria, Portugal and Morocco. There are also unverified accounts of sightings in Spain, Austria and Israel.
