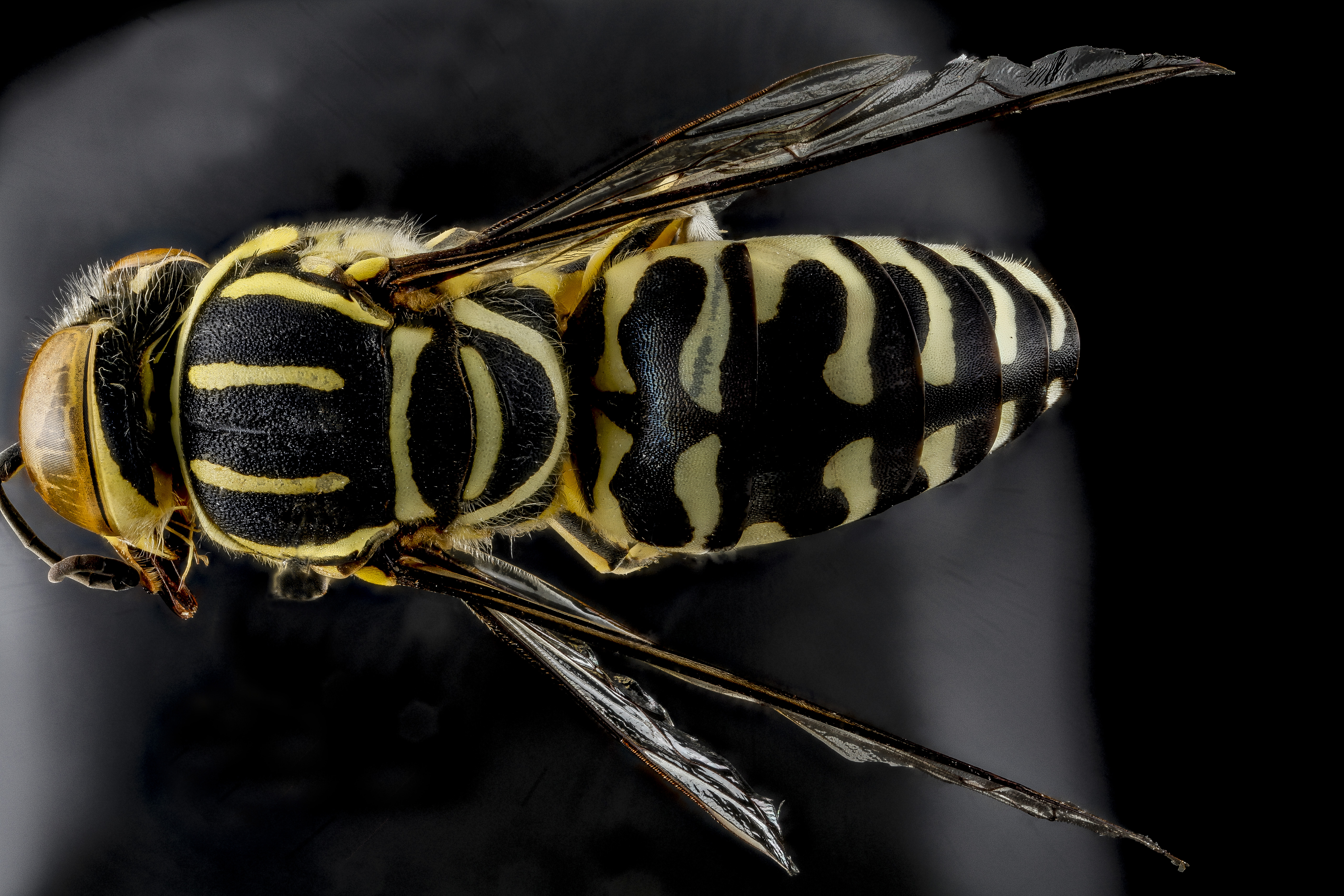
- Stictia signata female head

Scientific classification
- Kingdom: Animalia
- Phylum: Arthropoda
- Class: Insecta
- Order: Hymenoptera
- Family: Bembicidae
- Genus: Stictia
- Species: S. signata

Binomial name
- Stictia signata (Linnaeus, 1758)

Synonyms
- Apis signata (Linnaeus, 1758); Apis vespiformis De Geer, 1773; Bembex insularis (Dahlbom, 1844); Bembex signata (Linnaeus, 1758); Bembix signata (Linnaeus, 1758); Epibembex insularis (Dahlbom, 1844); Monedula insularis (Dahlbom, 1844); Monedula signata (Linnaeus, 1758); Vespa signata Linnaeus, 1758

= Stictia signata =

Species of wasp

Stictia signata is a species of sand wasp in the family Bembicidae. It is found in the Caribbean Sea, Central America, North America, and South America. It preys primarily on flies.

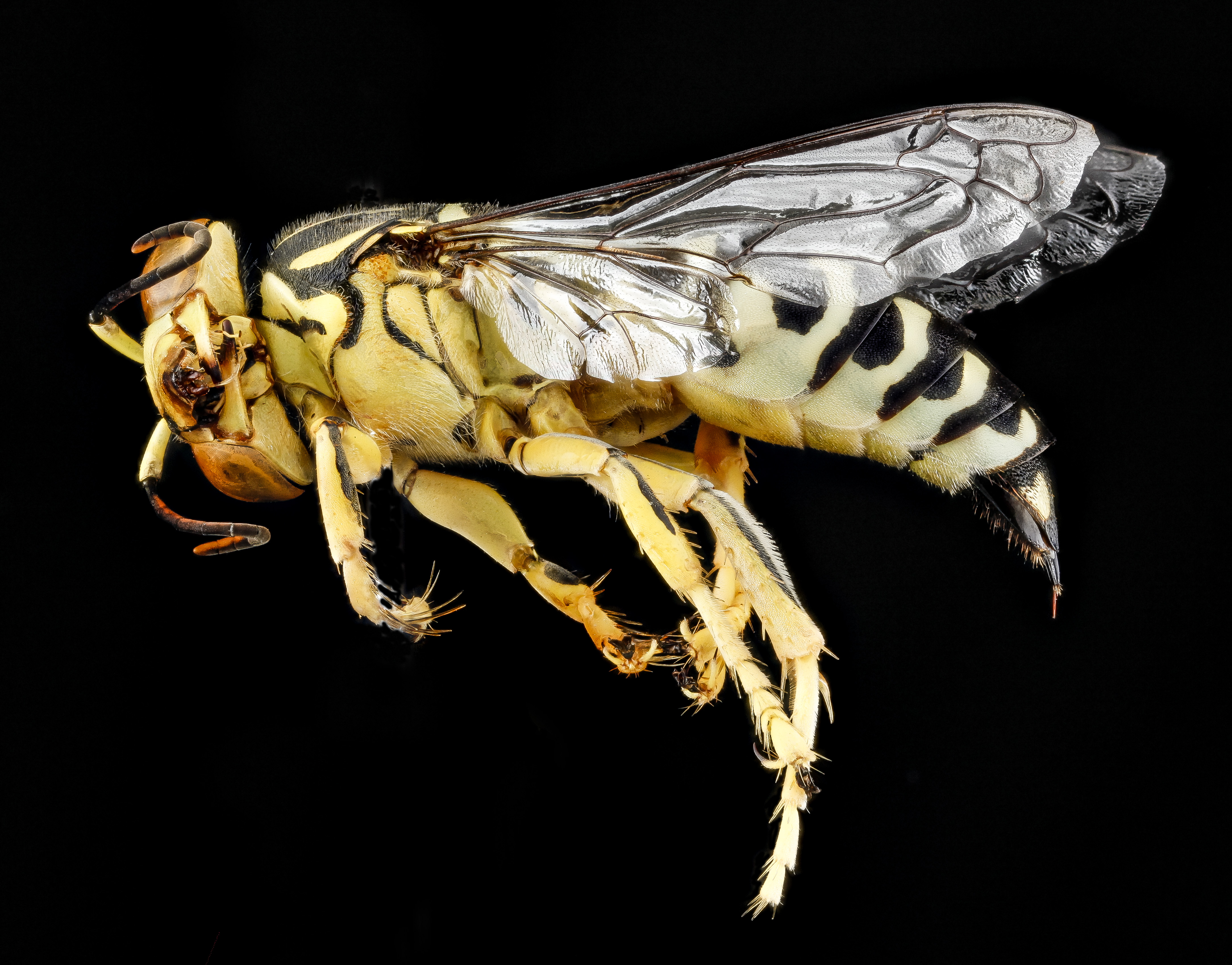
Stictia signata female lateral view

== Subspecies ==
These two subspecies belong to the species Stictia signata:

- Stictia signata aricana (Lohrmann, 1948)
- Stictia signata signata (Linnaeus, 1758)
