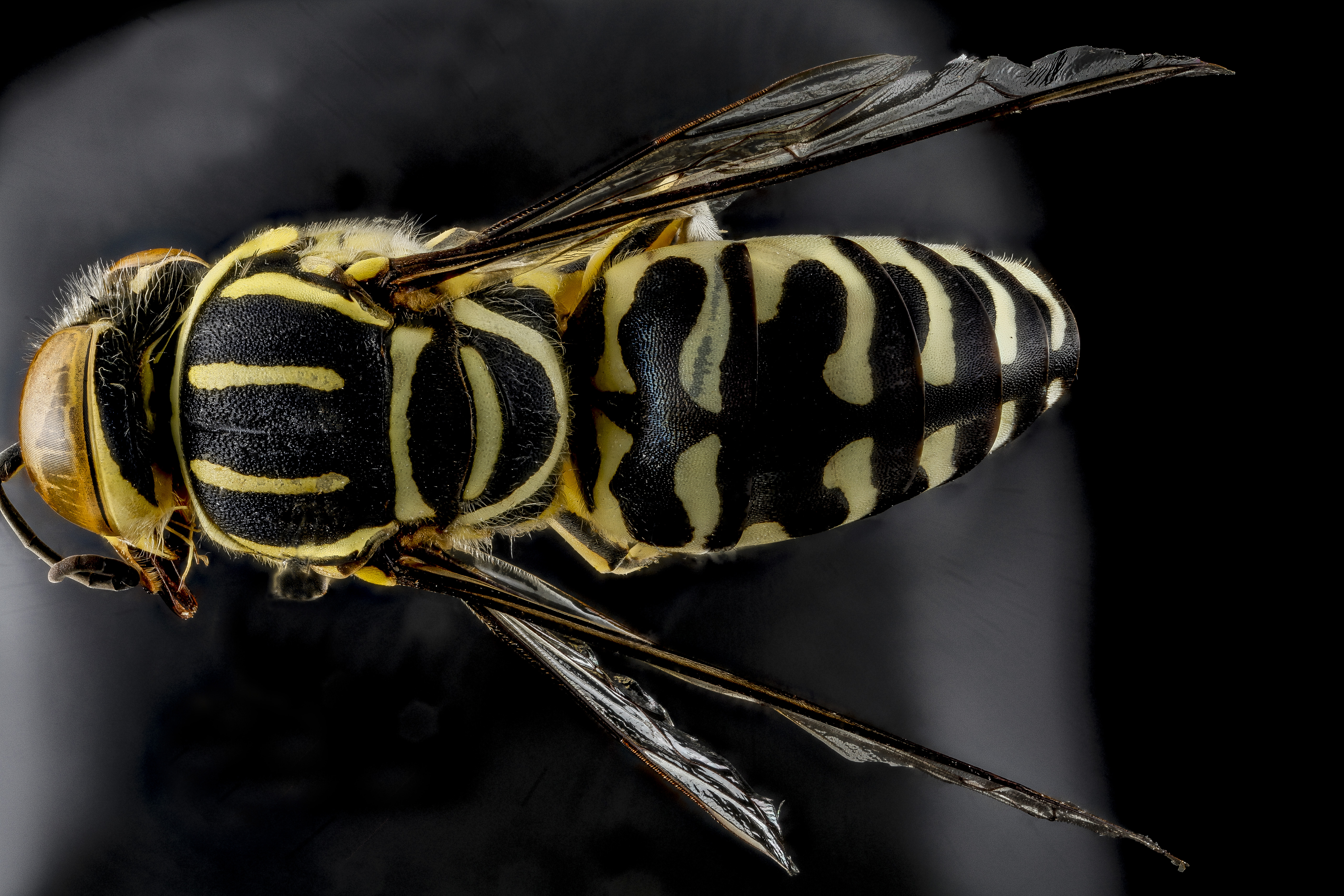
- Stictia signata

Scientific classification
- Domain: Eukaryota
- Kingdom: Animalia
- Phylum: Arthropoda
- Class: Insecta
- Order: Hymenoptera
- Family: Bembicidae
- Subfamily: Bembicinae
- Tribe: Bembicini
- Subtribe: Bembicina
- Genus: Stictia; Illiger, 1807

= Stictia =

Genus of wasps

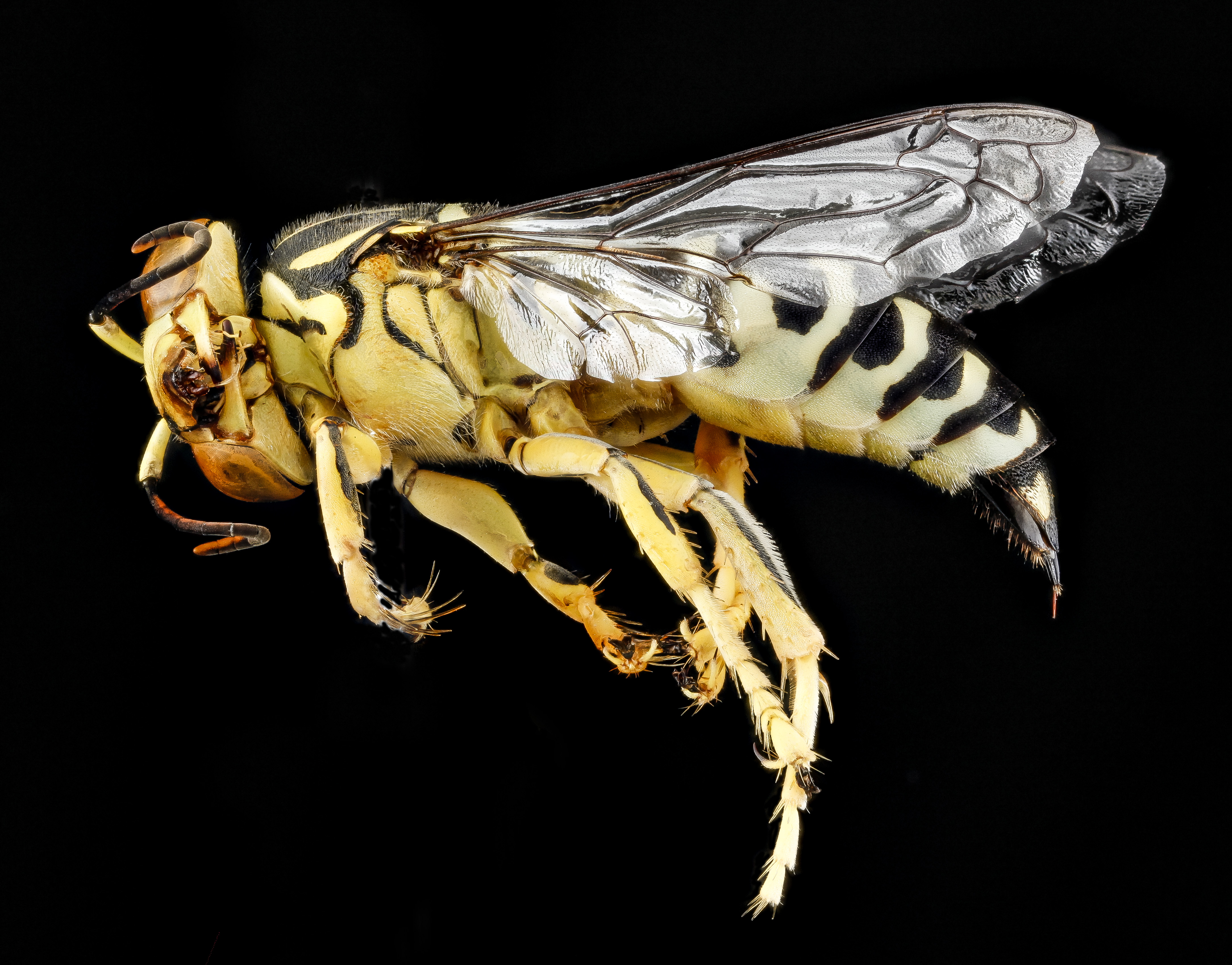
Stictia signata female lateral view

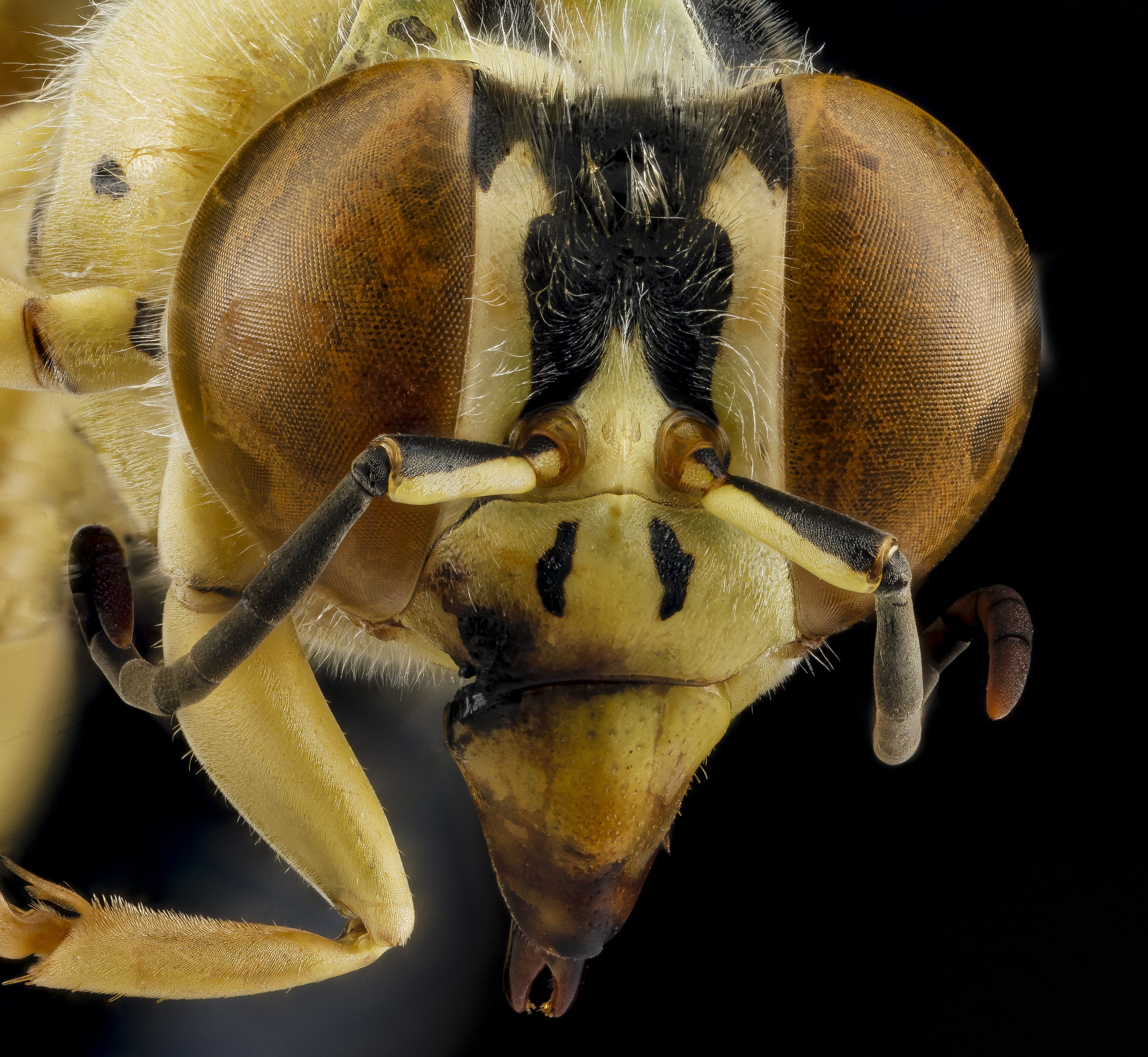
Stictia signata female head

Stictia is a largely neotropical genus of large, often brightly colored predatory sand wasps, consisting of about 30 species.

== List of species (selected) ==
- Stictia andrei (Handlirsch, 1890)
- Stictia antiopa (Handlirsch, 1890)
- Stictia arcuata (Gruppe Taschenberg, 1870)
- Stictia carolina (Fabricius, 1793)
- Stictia croceata (Lepeletier, 1845)
- Stictia decemmaculata (Packard, 1869)
- Stictia decorata (Gruppe Taschenberg, 1870)
- Stictia dives (Handlirsch, 1890)
- Stictia flexuosa (Gruppe Taschenberg, 1870)
- Stictia heros (Fabricius, 1804)
- Stictia infracta J.Parker, 1929
- Stictia maccus (Handlirsch, 1895)
- Stictia maculata (Fabricius, 1804)
- Stictia medea (Handlirsch, 1890)
- Stictia megacera Parker
- Stictia mexicana (Handlirsch, 1890)
- Stictia pantherina (Handlirsch, 1890)
- Stictia punctata (Fabricius, 1775)
- Stictia signata (Linnaeus, 1758)
- Stictia sombrana J.Parker, 1929
- Stictia trifasciata J.Parker, 1929
- Stictia vivida (Handlirsch)
