= Adersia =

Scientific classification
- Kingdom: Animalia
- Phylum: Arthropoda
- Class: Insecta
- Order: Diptera
- Family: Tabanidae
- Subfamily: Adersiinae
- Tribe: Adersiini
- Genus: Adersia; Austen, 1912

Type species
- Silvius oestroides Karsch, 1888

Synonyms
- Thalassomysops Dias, 1956

Genus of flies

Adersia is a genus of horseflies of the family Tabanidae. It is the only genus in the tribe Adersiini, and the only member of the subfamily Adersiinae.

== Species ==
- Adersia ambigua Oldroyd, 1957
- Adersia callani Oldroyd, 1957
- Adersia gandarai Dias, 1959
- Adersia guichardi Oldroyd, 1957
- Adersia maculenta (Dias, 1956)
- Adersia oestroides (Karsch, 1888)
