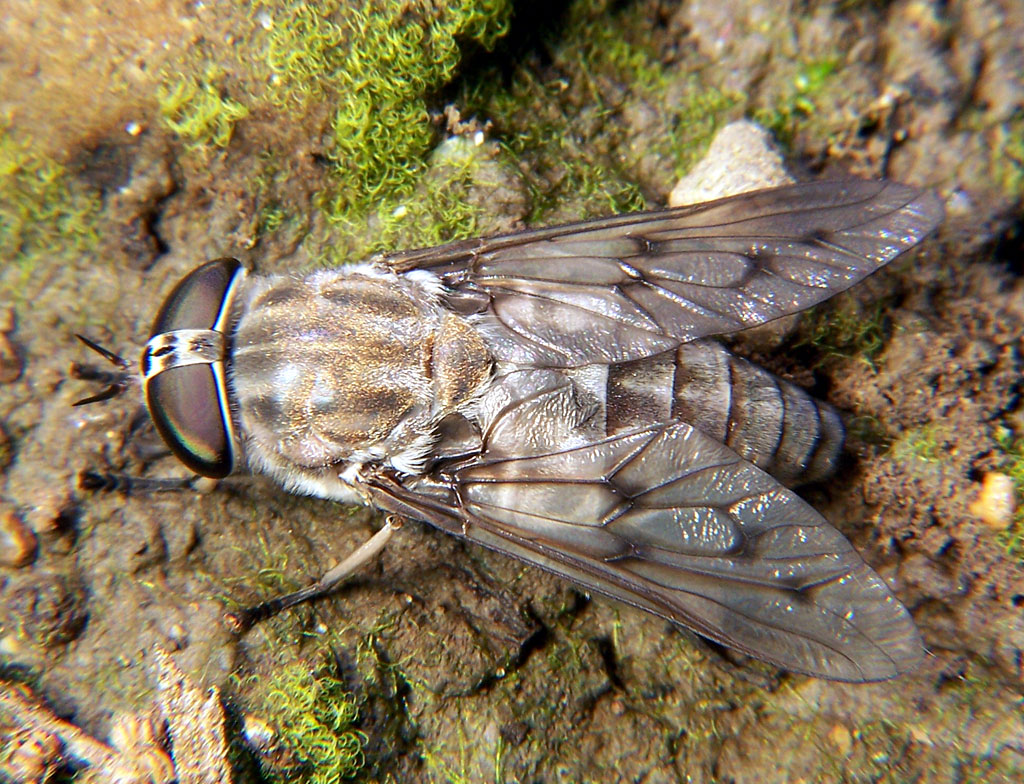
- Tabanus sulcifrons

Scientific classification
- Kingdom: Animalia
- Phylum: Arthropoda
- Clade: Pancrustacea
- Class: Insecta
- Order: Diptera
- Superfamily: Tabanoidea
- Family: Tabanidae; Latreille, 1802

Subfamilies
- Adersiinae; Chrysopsinae; Pangoniinae; Scepsidinae; Tabaninae

= Tabanidae =

Tabanidae Temporal range: Berriasian–Recent

Family of insects

Horse flies and deer flies (Note: For other names, see § Common names.) are true flies in the family Tabanidae in the insect order Diptera. The adults are often large and agile in flight. Female flies require a high protein diet and parasitize land vertebrates, including humans, biting them to obtain blood. They prefer to fly in sunlight, avoiding dark and shady areas, and are inactive at night. They are found all over the world except for some islands and the polar regions (Hawaii, Greenland, Iceland). Both horse flies and botflies (Oestridae) are sometimes referred to as gadflies. Contrary to popular belief, horse flies cannot see infrared light or otherwise detect heat at a distance.

Adult horse flies feed on nectar and plant exudates; males have weak mouthparts, but females have mouthparts strong enough to puncture the skin of large animals. This is for the purpose of obtaining enough protein from blood to produce eggs. The mouthparts of females are formed into a stout stabbing organ with two pairs of sharp cutting blades, and a spongelike part used to lap up the blood that flows from the wound. The larvae are predaceous and grow in semiaquatic habitats.

Female horse flies can transfer blood-borne diseases from one animal to another through their feeding habit. In areas where those diseases occur, they have been known to carry equine infectious anaemia virus, some trypanosomes, the filarial worm Loa loa, anthrax among cattle and sheep, and tularemia. They can reduce growth rates in cattle and lower the milk output of cows if suitable shelters are not provided.

Horse flies have long appeared in literature. The father of Greek tragedy, Aeschylus, depicts a gadfly (Ancient Greek: μύωψ, mýops) driving Io to madness in Prometheus Bound through its relentless pursuit. The philosopher Socrates later adopted the gadfly as an ironic mascot for his persistent questioning of those who spoke with him.

== Common names ==
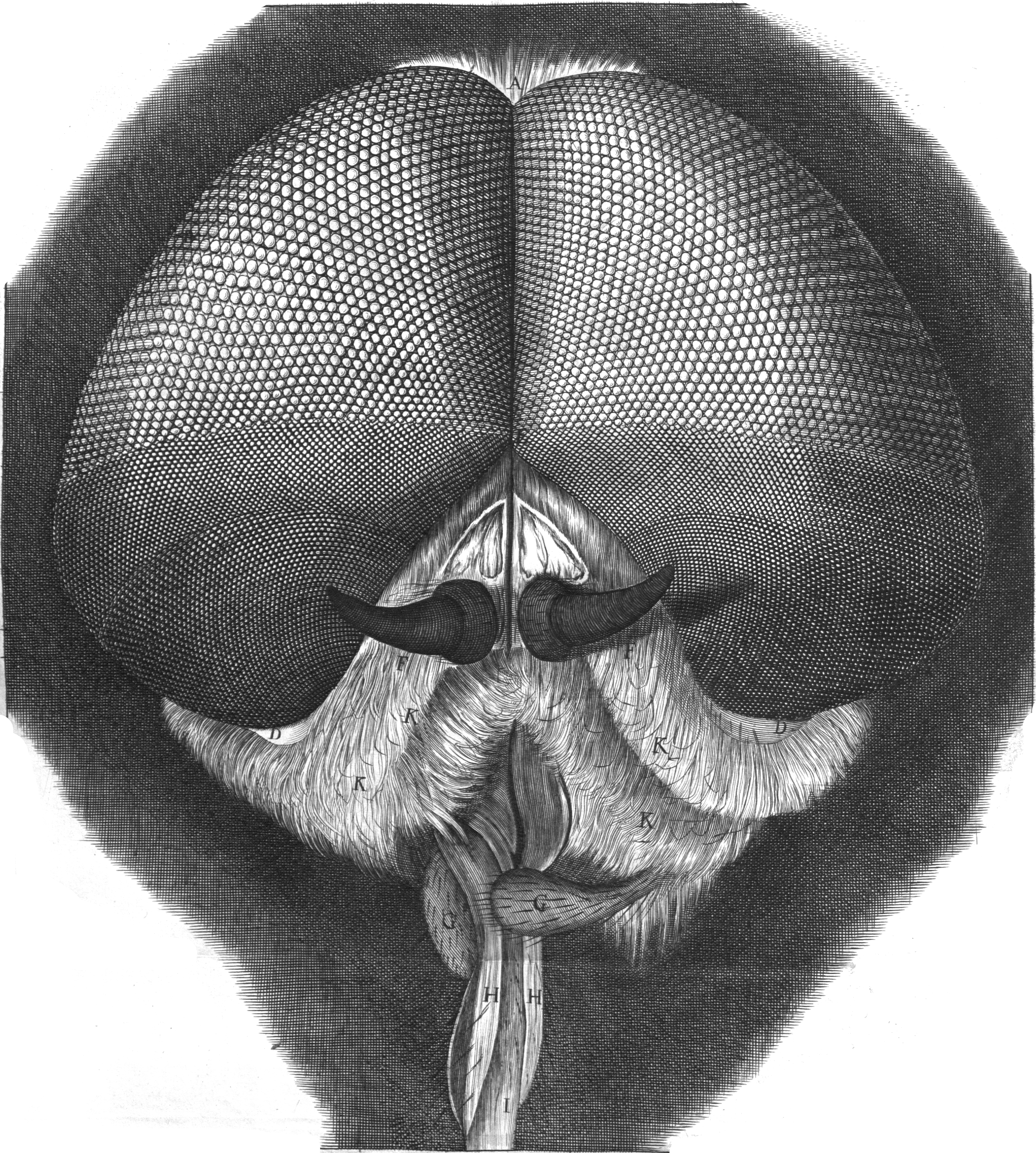
Robert Hooke marvelled at the eyes of a "drone fly" in his Micrographia (1665), perhaps the earliest accurate depiction of a horsefly.

Tabanidae are known by a large number of common names. The subfamily Chrysopsinae is known as deer flies, perhaps because of their abundance on moorland where deer roam, and buffalo-flies, moose-flies and elephant-flies emanate from other parts of the world where these animals are found. The term "horse fly" refers primarily to Tabaninae that are typically larger and stouter, and that lack the banded wings deer flies have. Other common names include tabanids, gadflies, green-headed flies, and green flies.

The word "Tabanus" was first recorded by Pliny the Younger and has survived as the generic name. In general, country folk did not distinguish between the various biting insects that irritated their cattle and called them all "gad-flies", from the word "gad" meaning "spike". Other common names include "cleg[g]", "gleg" or "clag", which come from Old Norse and may have originated from the Vikings. Other names such as "stouts" refer to the wide bodies of the insects and "dun-flies" to their sombre colouring. In Australia and the UK they are also known as March flies, a name used in other Anglophonic countries to refer to the non-bloodsucking Bibionidae.

== Description ==
Adult tabanids are large flies with prominent compound eyes, short antennae composed of three segments, and wide bodies. In females, the eyes are widely separated; in males, however, they are almost touching. The eyes are often patterned and brightly coloured in living tabanids but appear dull in preserved specimens. The terminal segment of the antennae is pointed and annulated, appearing to be composed of several tapering rings. There are no hairs or arista stemming from the antennae. Both the head and thorax are clad in short hairs, but no bristles are on the body. The membranous forewings are clear, either shaded uniformly grey or brown, or patterned in some species; they have a basal lobe (or calypter) that covers the modified knob-like hindwings or halteres. The tips of the legs have two lobes on the sides (pulvilli) and a central lobe (empodium) in addition to two claws that enable them to grip to surfaces. Species recognition is based on details of head structures (antennae, frons, and maxillae), wing venation, and body patterning; minute variations of surface structure cause subtle alterations of the overlying hairs, which alters the appearance of the body.

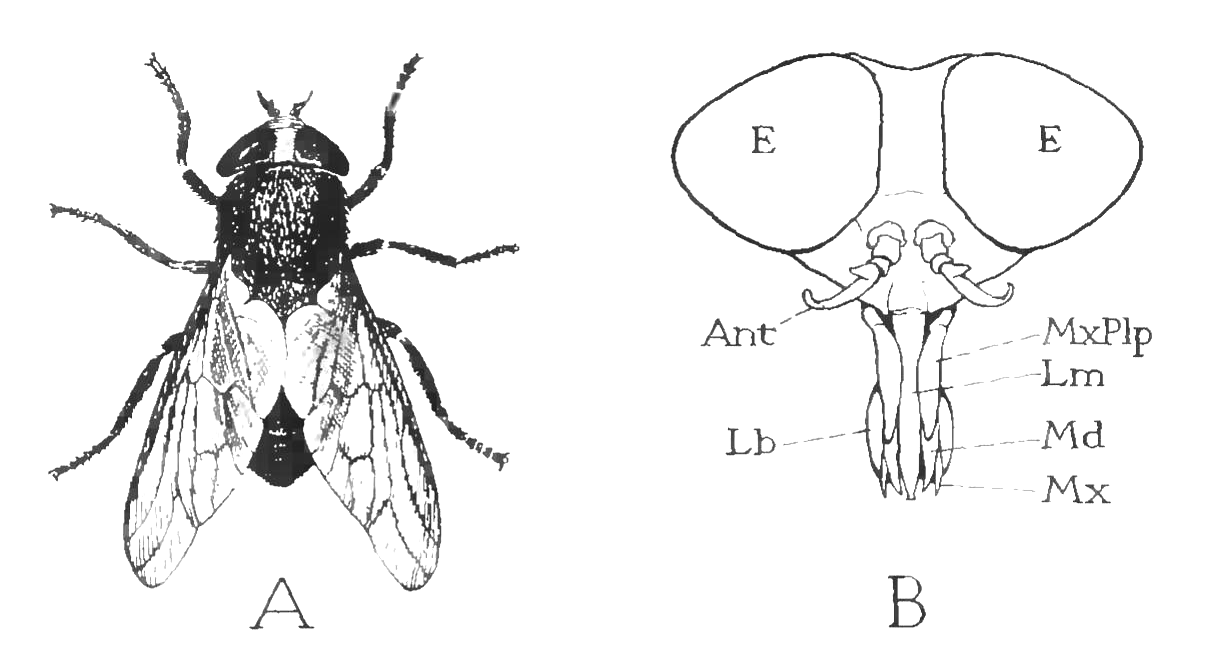
Diagram of the head of Tabanus atratus. Large compound eyes (E), short antennae (Ant), blade-like mandible (Md)

Tabanid species range from medium-sized to very large, robust insects. Most have a body length between 5 and 25 mm (0.2 and 1.0 in), with the largest having a wingspan of 60 mm (2.4 in). Deer flies in the genus Chrysops are up to 10 mm (0.4 in) long, have yellow to black bodies and striped abdomens, and membranous wings with dark patches. Horse flies (genus Tabanus) are larger, up to 25 mm (1 in) in length and are mostly dark brown or black, with dark eyes, often with a metallic sheen. Yellow flies (genus Diachlorus) are similar in shape to deer flies, but have yellowish bodies and the eyes are purplish-black with a green sheen. Some species in the subfamily Pangoniinae have an exceptionally long proboscis (tubular mouthpart).

=== Vision ===
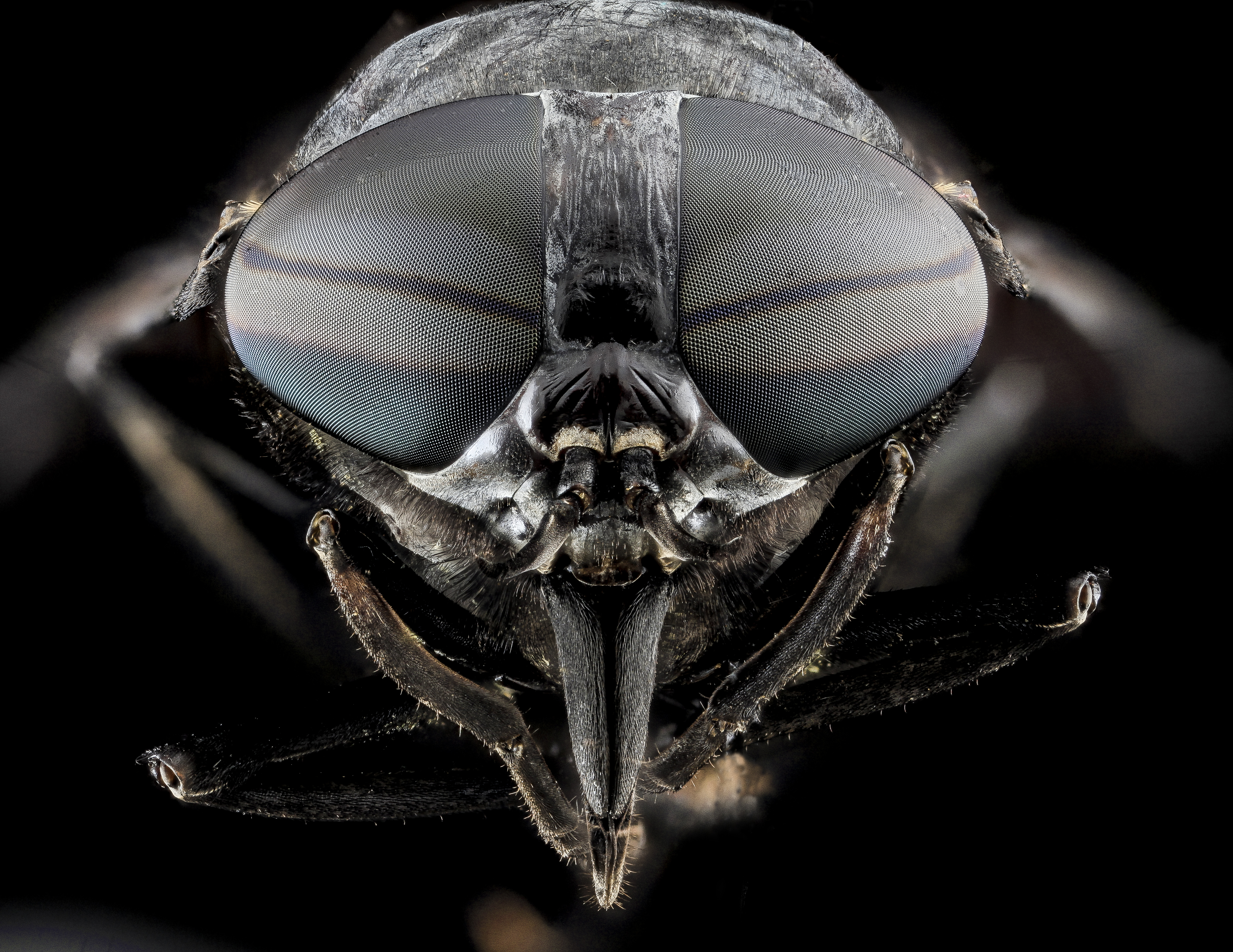
Head of Tabanus atratus showing large compound eyes, short antennae (between and below the eyes) and stout feeding apparatus

Like in many insects, the compound eyes of tabanids are capable of detecting the polarization of light. In female tabanids, it is a determining factor in their host targeting. The optical units (ommatidia) making up the compound eye of flies of the suborder brachycera contain a cluster of 8 photoreceptor cells (retinula cells; R); R1–6 on the cluster's rim are for achromatic vision and motion detection, while R7 and R8 in the cluster's center detect color and polarity of incoming light. Despite the clear differences between the outer R1-6 and the inner R7 and R8, the two groups do overlap to an extent in their function. There are two kinds of ommatidia, termed pale and yellow, that differ only in the wavelength sensitivity of R8. R1–R6 share a sensitivity to light from ultraviolet into the green wavelength range. The sensitivity of R7 peaks in ultraviolet, while R8 peaks in blue and green for pale and yellow respectively. With the peak sensitivity of the color-seeing retinula cells being in the blue and green wavelength ranges, they are not able to detect significant amounts of light in the infrared and red wavelengths. They are therefore not able to see the heat of objects by the infrared light they radiate.

=== Larva ===
The larvae are long and cylindrical or spindle-shaped with small heads and 12 body segments. They have rings of tubercles (warty outgrowths) known as pseudopods around the segments, and also bands of short setae (bristles). The posterior tip of each larva has a breathing siphon and a bulbous area known as Graber's organ. The outlines of the adult insect's head and wings are visible through the pupa, which has seven moveable abdominal segments, all except the front one of which bears a band of setae. The posterior end of the pupa bears a group of spine-like tubercles.

== Distribution and habitat ==
Tabanids are found worldwide, except for the polar regions, but they are absent from some islands such as Greenland, Iceland, and Hawaii. The genera Tabanus, Chrysops, and Haematopota all occur in temperate, subtropical, and tropical locations, but Haematopota is absent from Australia and South America. They mostly occur in warm areas with suitable moist locations for breeding, but also occupy a wide range of habitats from deserts to alpine meadows. They are found from sea level to at least 3,300 m (10,800 ft).

== Evolution and taxonomy ==
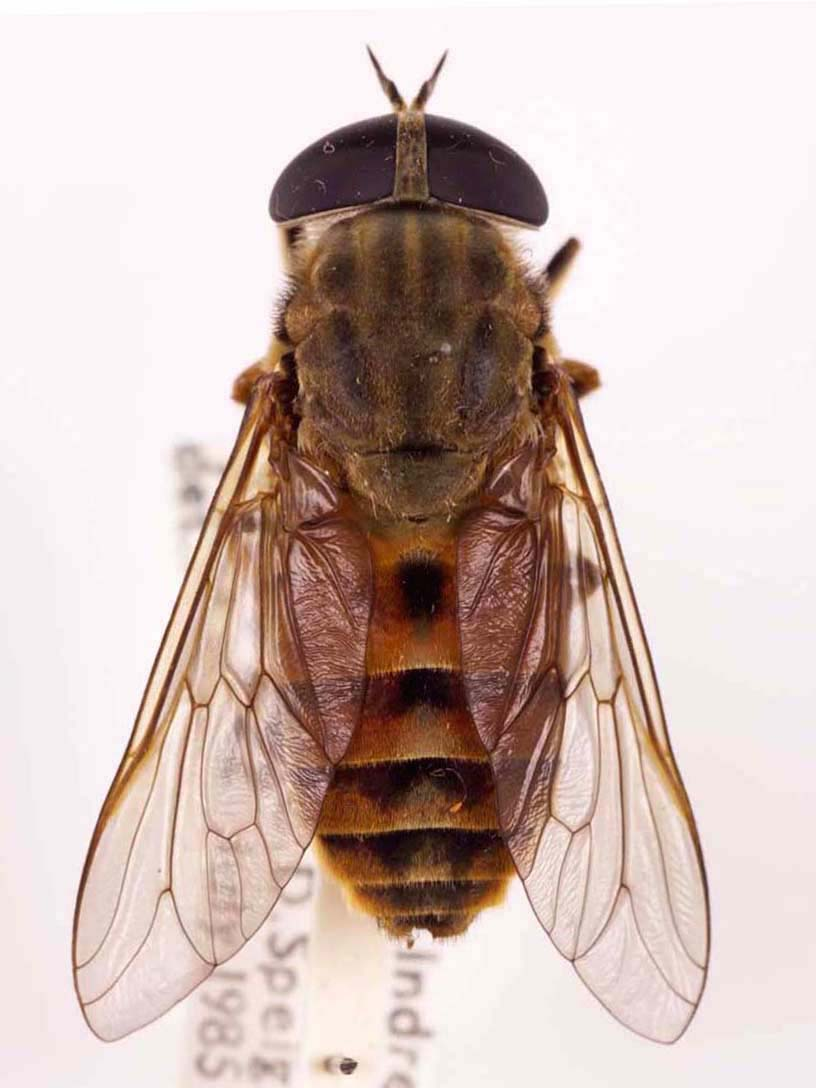
A horse fly, Tabanus eggeri, France

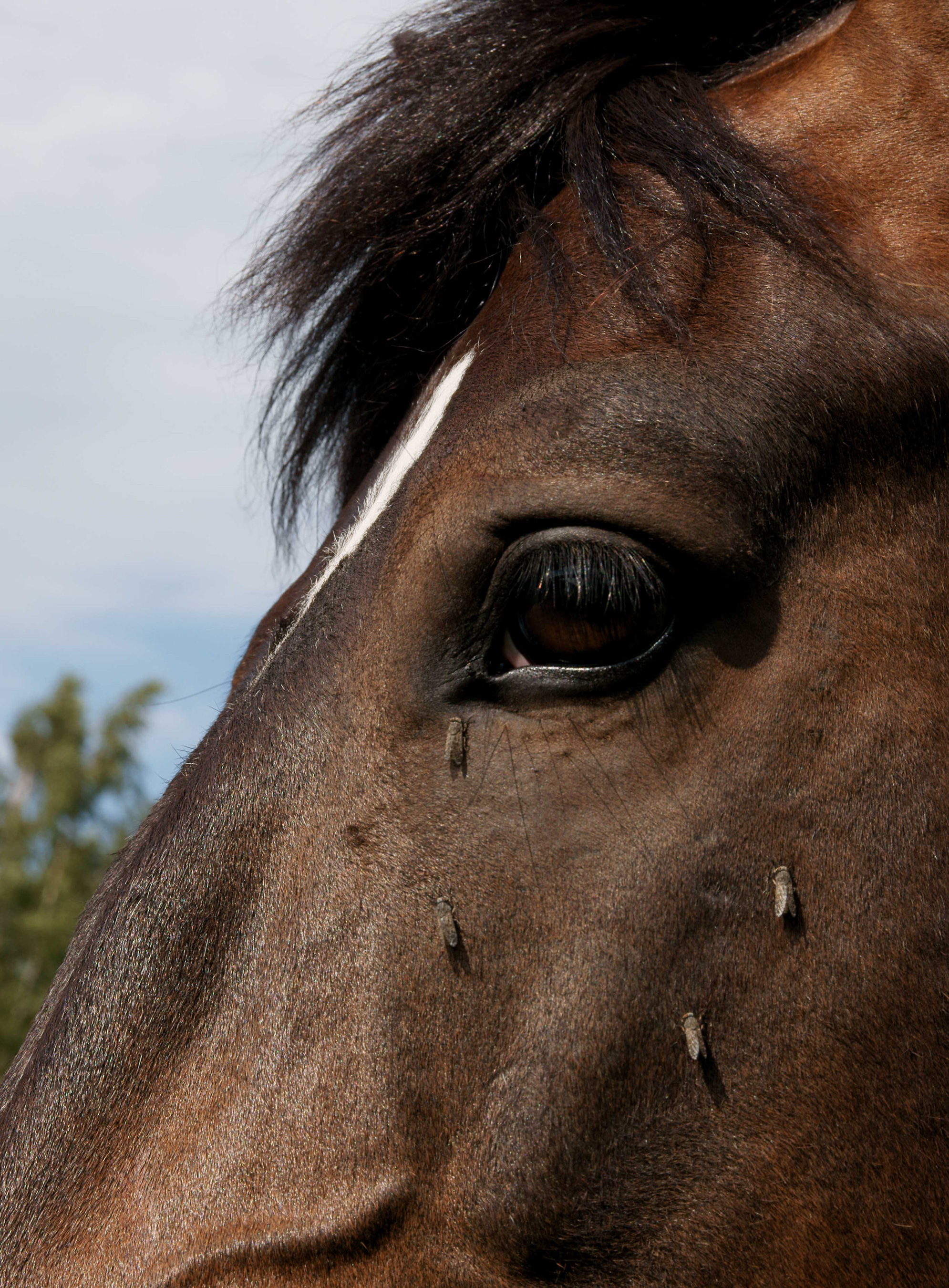
Horse flies Haematopota pluvialis feeding on a horse's head

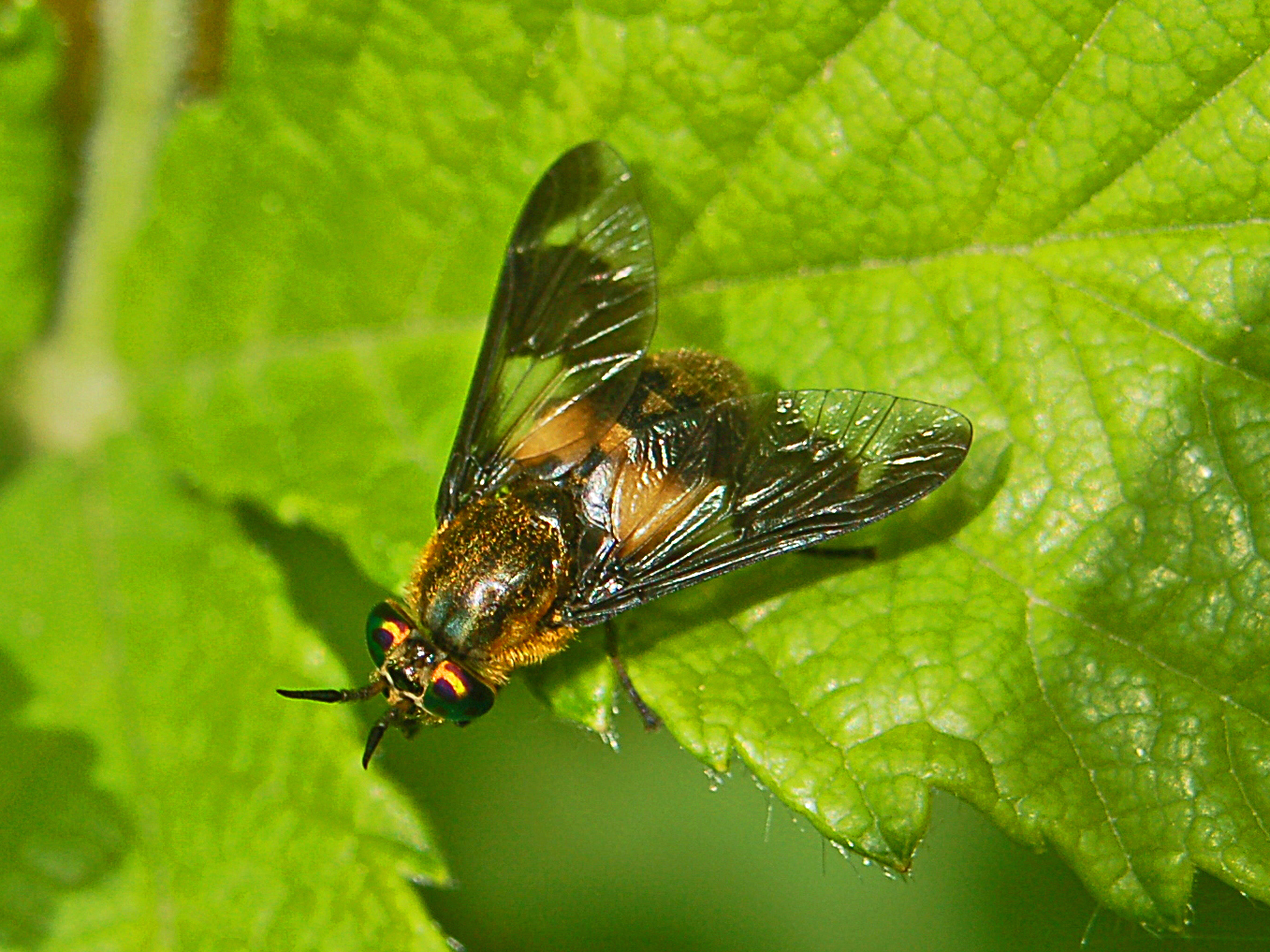
A deer fly, Chrysops caecutiens

The oldest records of the family come from the Early Cretaceous, with the oldest record being Eotabanoid, known from wings found in the Berriasian (145–140 million years ago) Purbeck Group of England. Although the bloodsucking habit is associated with a long proboscis, a fossil insect that has elongated mouthparts is not necessarily a bloodsucker, as it may instead have fed on nectar. The ancestral tabanids may have co-evolved with the angiosperm plants on which they fed. With a necessity for high-protein food for egg production, the diet of early tabanomorphs was probably predatory, and from this, the bloodsucking habit may have evolved. In the Santana Formation in Brazil, no mammals have been found, so the fossil tabanids found there likely fed on reptiles. Cold bloodsucking probably preceded warm bloodsucking, but some dinosaurs are postulated to have been warm-blooded and may have been early hosts for the horse flies.

The Tabanidae are true flies and members of the insect order Diptera. With the families Athericidae, Pelecorhynchidae and Oreoleptidae, Tabanidae are classified in the superfamily Tabanoidea. Along with the Rhagionoidea, this superfamily makes up the infraorder Tabanomorpha. Tabanoid families seem to be united by the presence of a venom canal in the mandible of the larvae. Worldwide, about 4,455 species of Tabanidae have been described, over 1,300 of them in the genus Tabanus.

Tabanid identification is based mostly on adult morphological characters of the head, wing venation, and sometimes the last abdominal segment. The genitalia are very simple and do not provide clear species differentiation as in many other insect groups. In the past, most taxonomic treatments considered the family to be composed of three subfamilies: Pangoniinae (tribes Pangoniini, Philolichini, Scionini), Chrysopsinae (tribes Bouvieromyiini, Chrysopsini, Rhinomyzini), and Tabaninae (tribes Diachlorini, Haematopotini, Tabanini). Some treatments increased this to five subfamilies, adding the subfamily Adersiinae, with the single genus Adersia, and the subfamily Scepcidinae, with the two genera Braunsiomyia and Scepsis.

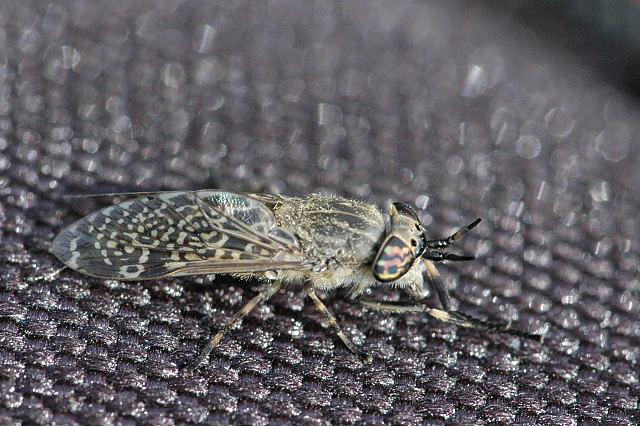
Horseflies in the genus Haematopota typically have speckled wings.

A 2015 study by Morita et al. using nucleotide data, aimed to clarify the phylogeny of the Tabanidae and supports three subfamilies. The subfamilies Pangoniinae and Tabaninae were shown to be monophyletic. The tribes Philolichini, Chrysopsini, Rhinomyzini, and Haematopotini were found to be monophyletic, with the Scionini also being monophyletic apart from the difficult-to-place genus Goniops. Adersia was recovered within the Pangoniini as were the genera previously placed in the Scepcidinae, and Mycteromyia and Goniops were recovered within the Chrysopsini.

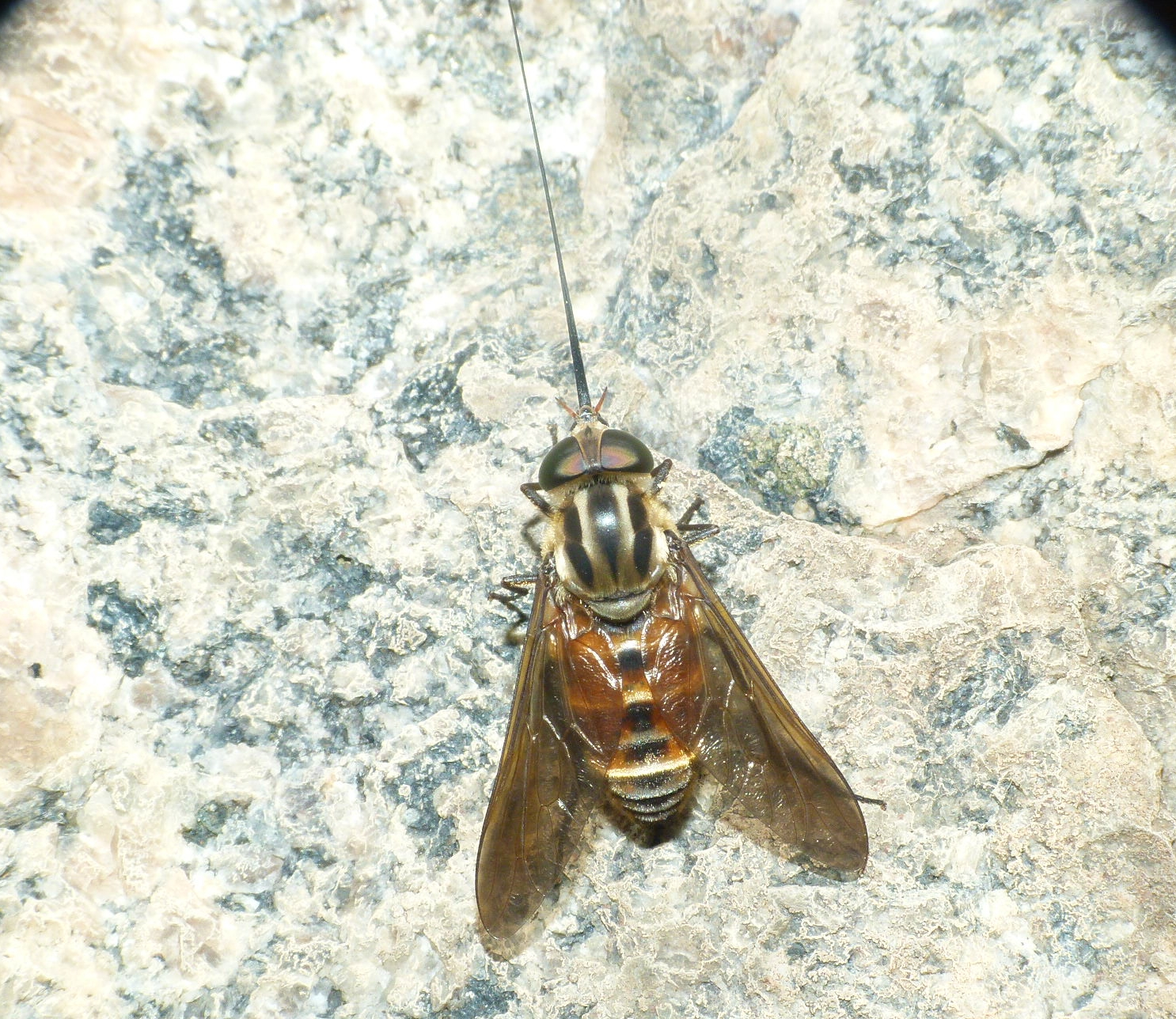
Long-tongued horseflies (subfamily Pangoniinae) like this Philoliche sp. have specialized nectar-sucking mouthparts.

The Tabaninae lack ocelli (simple eyes) and have no spurs on the tips of their hind tibiae. In the Pangoniinae, ocelli are present and the antennal flagellum (whip-like structure) usually has eight annuli (or rings). In the Chrysopsinae, the antennal flagellum has a basal plate and the flagellum has four annuli. Females have a shining callus on the frons (front of the head between the eyes). The Adersiinae have a divided tergite on the ninth abdominal segment, and the Scepsidinae have highly reduced mouthparts. Members of the family Pelecorhynchidae were initially included in the Tabanidae and moved into the Rhagionidae before being elevated into a separate family. The infraorder Tabanomorpha shares the blood-feeding habit as a common primitive characteristic, although this is restricted to the female.

Two well-known genera are the common horse flies, Tabanus, named by Swedish taxonomist Carl Linnaeus in 1758, and the deer flies, Chrysops, named by the German entomologist Johann Wilhelm Meigen in 1802. Meigen did pioneering research on flies and was the author of Die Fliegen (The Flies); he gave the name Haematopota, meaning "blood-drinker", to another common genus of horse flies.

== Biology ==
=== Diet and biting behavior ===
Adult tabanids feed on nectar and plant exudates, and some are important pollinators of certain specialised flowers; several South African and Asian species in the Pangoniinae have spectacularly long probosces adapted for the extraction of nectar from flowers with long, narrow corolla tubes, such as Lapeirousia, and certain Pelargonium.

Both males and females engage in nectar-feeding, but females of most species are anautogenous, meaning they require a blood meal before they are able to reproduce effectively. To obtain the blood, the females, but not the males, bite animals, including humans. The female needs about six days to fully digest her blood meal and after that, she needs to find another host.

Both male and female flies are strongly attracted to polarized light reflecting off of dark objects, and in females it appears to be the primary determining factor in guiding them to a host for feeding, as males and females can readily be attracted by black inanimate objects with a smooth and reflective texture. In observations of wild tabanids, the tilt of a surface relative to the direction of gravity also significantly affects their behavior. The most attractive surfaces were ones parallel to the ground. Males and females differed in how they reacted to ever-increasing tilt. Males became less likely to land the higher the surface was tilted. Females initially also became less likely to land the higher the tilt became, but the trend reversed at a tilt of 75° degrees, hit a secondary (albeit much smaller) peak when the surface was perpendicular to the ground, and then rapidly declined again. Neither males nor females were attracted to "overhanging" surfaces a step above 90° to any meaningful degree.

The same study also found that tabanids, contrary to popular belief, do not have the capability to detect warmth or heat at a distance. In their observations, the temperature of a surface did not affect the landing frequency of the flies. Flies were just as inclined to land on a surface that would burn them as they were with other surfaces. They merely differed in how long the flies stayed on the surface, with the flies landing on high-temperature ones taking flight again very quickly. The researchers therefore concluded that tabanids are not aware of any surface's temperature until they land on it.

The flies mainly choose large mammals such as cattle, horses, camels, and deer, but few are species-specific. They have also been observed feeding on smaller mammals, birds, lizards, and turtles, and even on animals that have recently died. Unlike many biting insects such as mosquitoes, whose biting mechanism and saliva allow a bite to not be noticed by the host at the time, bites from tabanids are immediately irritating to the victim, so that they are often brushed off, and may have to visit multiple hosts to obtain sufficient blood. This behaviour means that they may carry disease-causing organisms from one host to another. Large animals and livestock are generally powerless to dislodge the fly, so there is no selective advantage for the flies to evolve a less immediately painful bite.

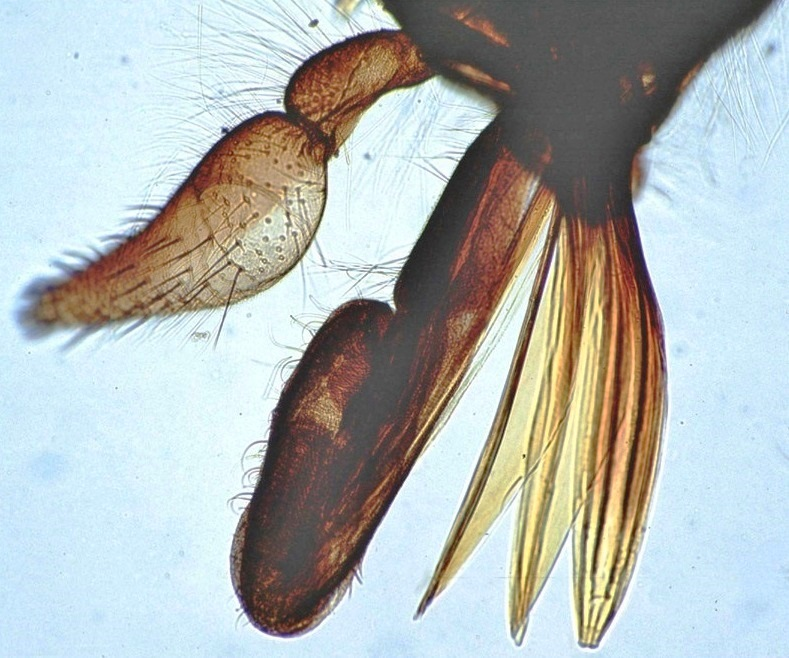
Tabanus mouthparts: The sharp cutting stylets are on the right, the spongelike lapping part in the centre.

The mouthparts of females are of the usual dipteran form and consist of a bundle of six chitinous stylets that, together with a fold of the fleshy labium, form the proboscis. On either side of these are two maxillary palps. When the insect lands on an animal, it grips the surface with its clawed feet, the labium is retracted, the head is thrust downwards and the stylets slice into the flesh. Some of these have sawing edges and muscles can move them from side-to-side to enlarge the wound. Saliva containing anticoagulant is injected into the wound to prevent clotting. The blood that flows from the wound is lapped up by another mouthpart which functions as a sponge. Bites can be painful for a day or more; fly saliva may provoke allergic reactions such as hives and difficulty with breathing. Tabanid bites can make life outdoors unpleasant for humans, and can reduce milk output in cattle. They are attracted by polarized reflections from water, making them a particular nuisance near swimming pools. Since tabanids prefer to be in sunshine, they normally avoid shaded places such as barns, and are inactive at night.

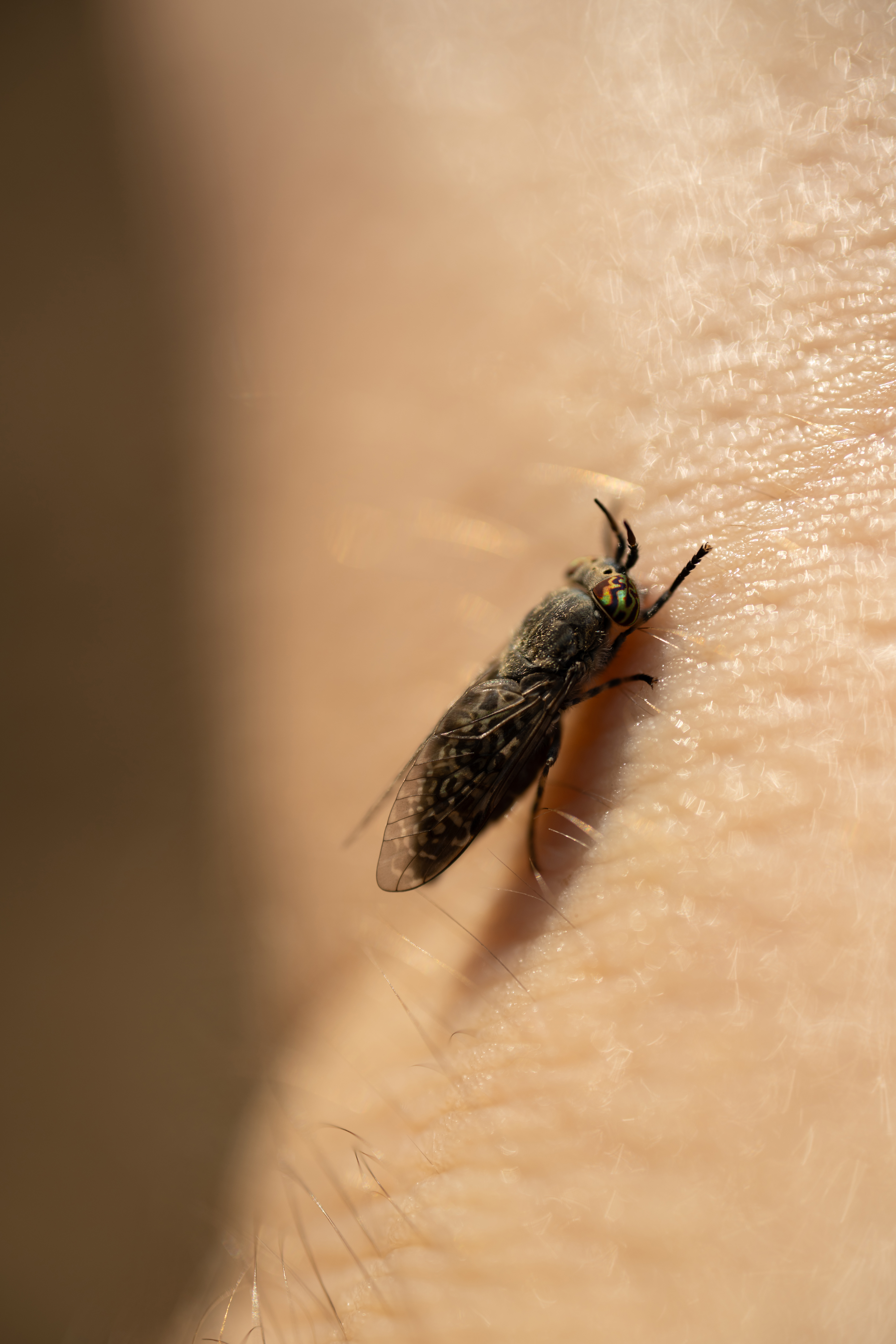
Tabanus sudeticus actively biting human hand.

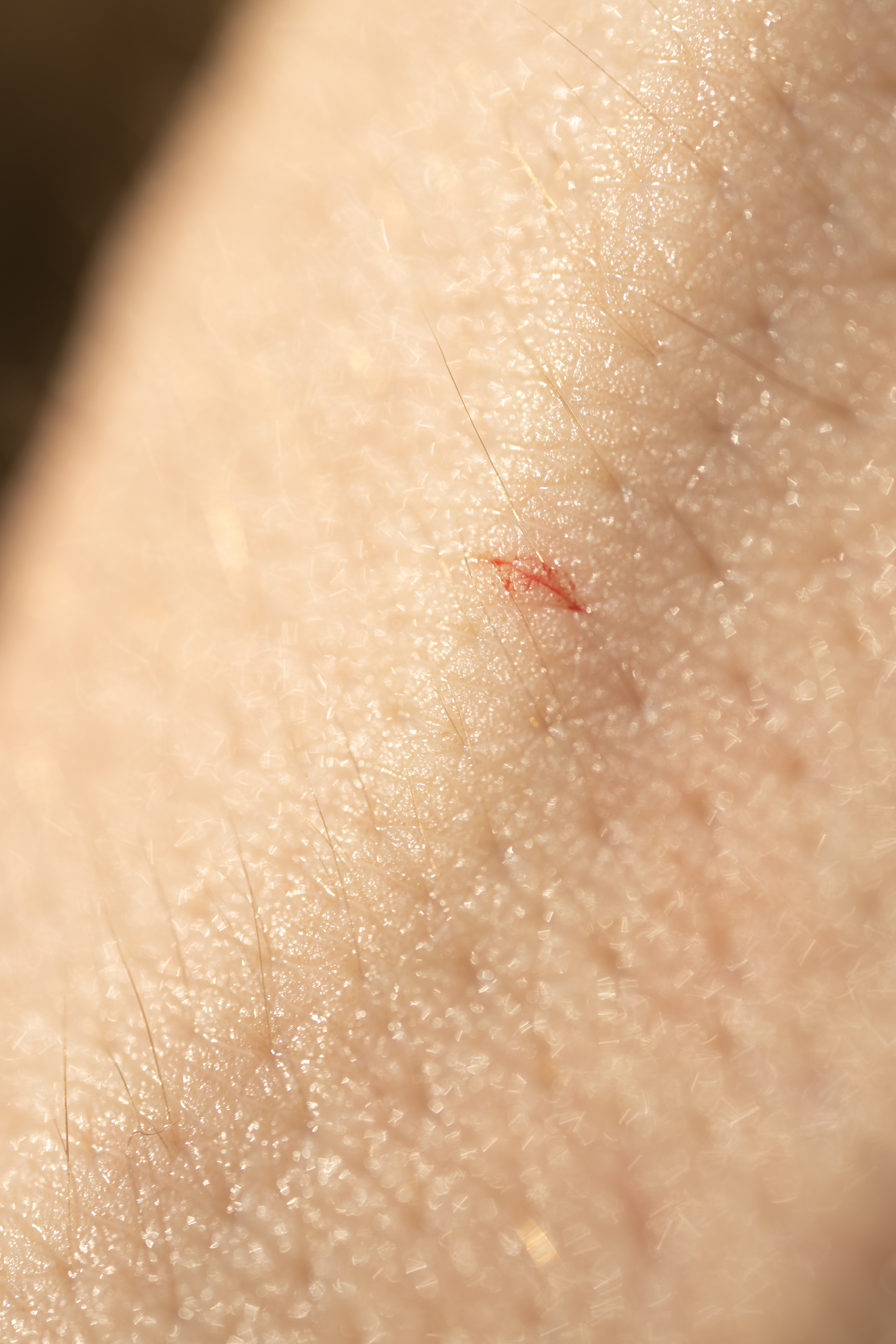
Hand immediately after bite, incision pictured.

Attack patterns vary with species; clegs fly silently and prefer to bite humans on the wrist or bare leg; large species of Tabanus buzz loudly, fly low, and bite ankles, legs, or backs of knees; Chrysops flies somewhat higher, bites the back of the neck, and has a high buzzing note. The striped hides of zebras may have evolved to reduce their attractiveness to horse flies and tsetse flies. The closer together the stripes, the fewer flies are visually attracted; the zebra's legs have particularly fine striping, and this is the shaded part of the body that is most likely to be bitten in other, unstriped equids. More recent research by the same lead author shows that the stripes were no less attractive to tabanids, but they merely touched—and could not make a controlled landing to bite. This suggests that a function of the stripes was interfering with optic flow. This does not preclude the possible use of stripes for other purposes such as signaling or camouflage. Another disruptive mechanism may also be in play, however: a study comparing horse fly behaviour when approaching horses wearing either striped or check-patterned rugs, when compared with plain rugs, found that both patterns were equally effective in deterring the insects.

=== Reproduction ===
Mating often occurs in swarms, generally at landmarks such as hilltops. The season, time of day, and type of landmark used for mating swarms are specific to particular species.

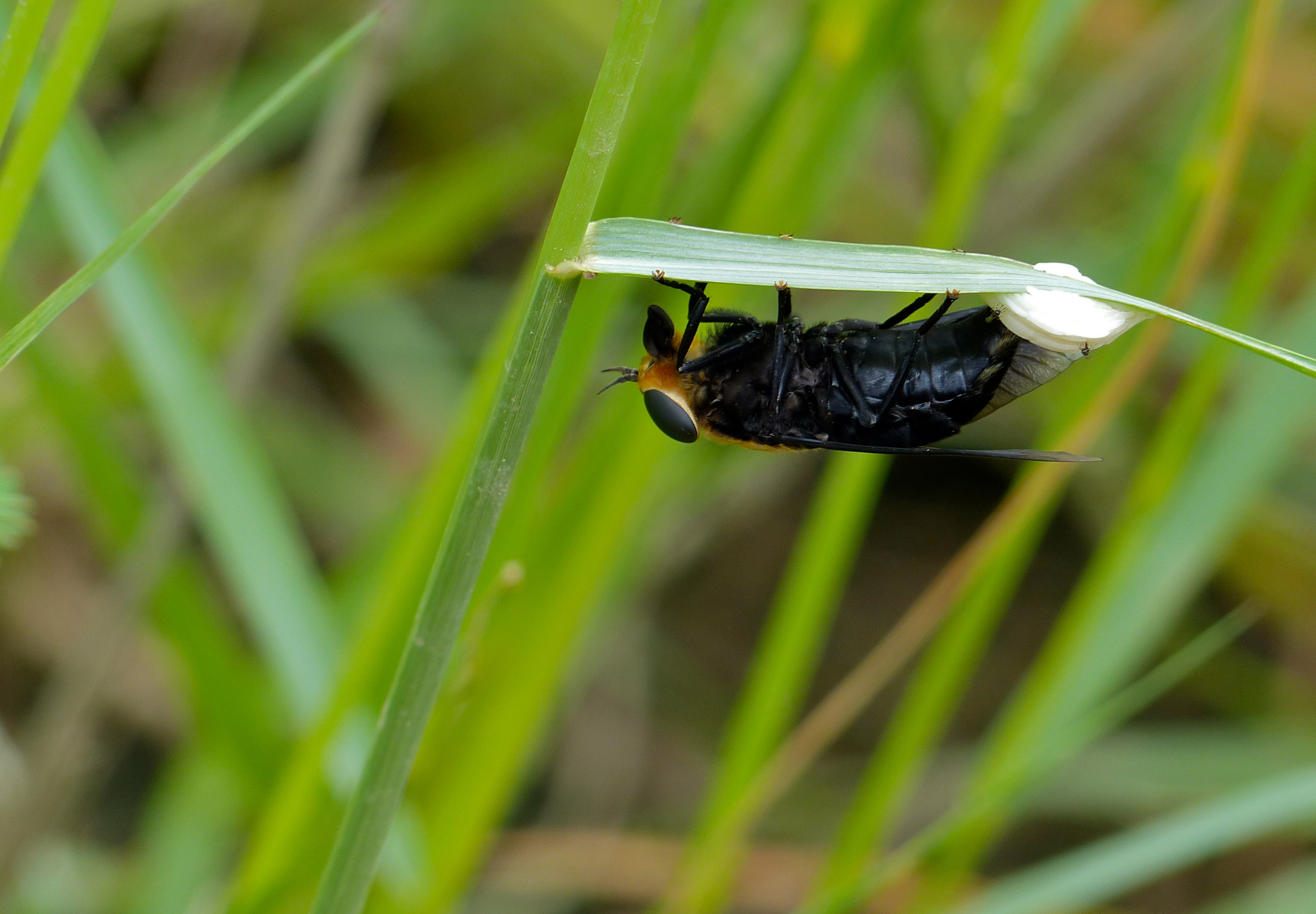
Female horse fly laying eggs

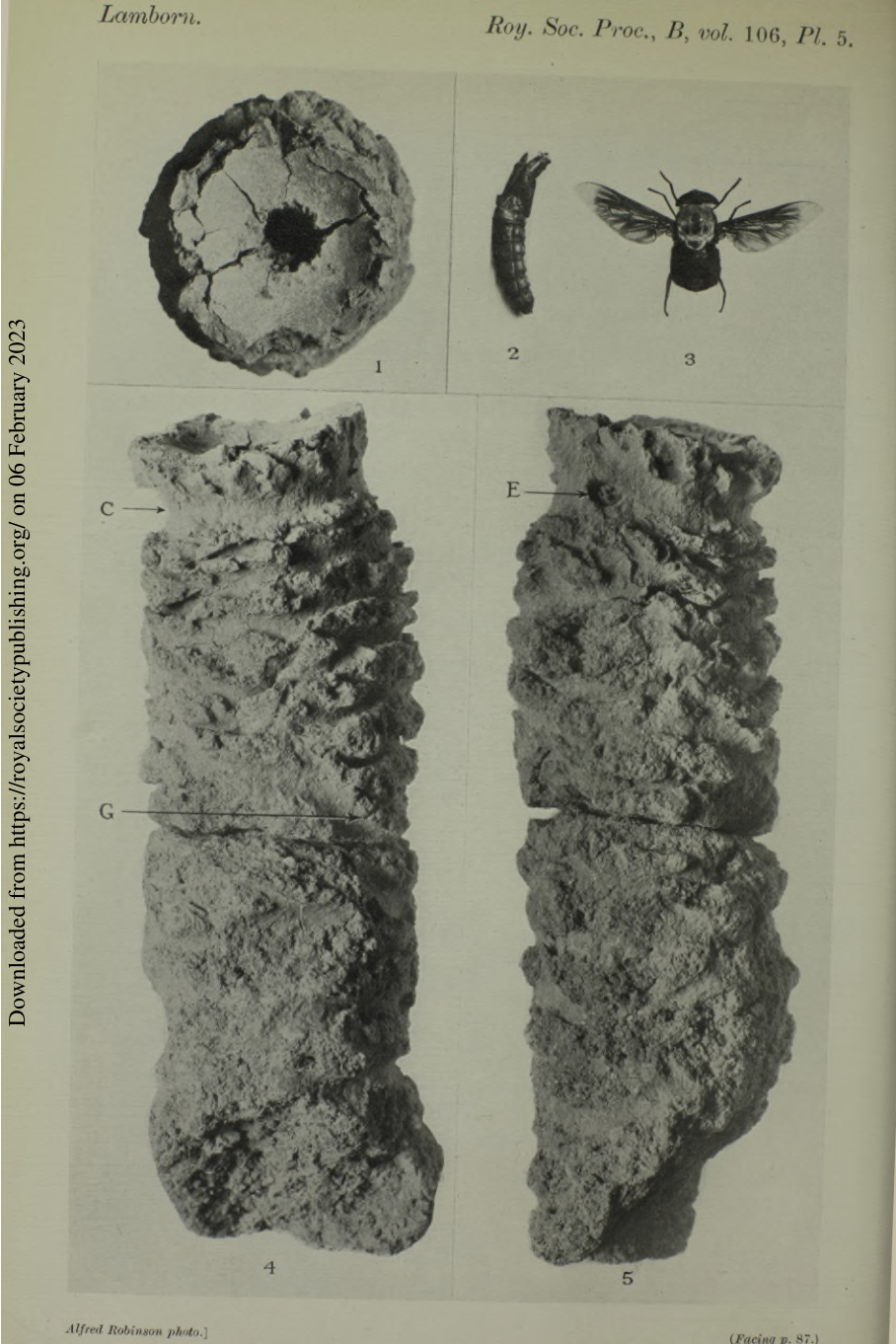
A mud cylinder created by a tabanid before pupation

Eggs are laid on stones or vegetation near water, in clusters of up to 1000, especially on emergent water plants. The eggs are white at first but darken with age. They hatch after about six days, with the emerging larvae using a special hatching spike to open the egg case. The larvae fall into the water or onto the moist ground below. Chrysops species develop in particularly wet locations, while Tabanus species prefer drier places. The larvae are legless grubs, tapering at both ends. They have small heads and 11 or 13 segments and moult six to 13 times over the course of a year or more. In temperate species, the larvae have a quiescent period during winter (diapause), while tropical species breed several times a year. In the majority of species, they are white, but in some, they are greenish or brownish, and they often have dark bands on each segment. A respiratory siphon at the hind end allows the larvae to obtain air when submerged in water. Larvae of nearly all species are carnivorous, often cannibalistic in captivity, and consume worms, insect larvae, and arthropods. The larvae may be parasitized by nematodes, flies of the families Bombyliidae and Tachinidae, and Hymenoptera in the family Pteromalidae. When fully developed, the larvae move into drier soil near the surface of the ground to pupate. In dry places a "remarkable" adaptation was discovered in the 1920s by W.A. Lamborn in Malawi (then Nyasaland). The larvae were discovered to tunnel in a spiral motion while the mud was still wet and plastic, forming a partitioned cylinder in the center of which the larva settled to pupate after closing the entrance; this adaption protects the pupae against mudcracks when the mud dries up, as a spreading crack would change direction when it hit the wall of the cylinder.

The pupae are brown and glossy, rounded at the head end, and tapering at the other end. Wing and limb buds can be seen and each abdominal segment is fringed with short spines. After about two weeks, metamorphosis is complete, the pupal case splits along the thorax, and the adult fly emerges. Males usually appear first, but when both sexes have emerged, mating takes place, courtship starting in the air and finishing on the ground. The female needs to feed on blood before depositing her egg mass.

=== Flight ===
Some species, such as deerflies and the Australian March flies, are known for being extremely noisy during flight, though clegs, for example, fly quietly and bite with little warning. Tabanids are agile fliers; Hybomitra species have been observed to perform aerial manoeuvres similar to those performed by fighter jets, such as the Immelmann turn. Horseflies can lay claim to being the fastest flying insects; the male Hybomitra hinei wrighti has been recorded reaching speeds of up to 145 kilometres per hour (90 mph) when pursuing a female.

=== Predators and parasites ===
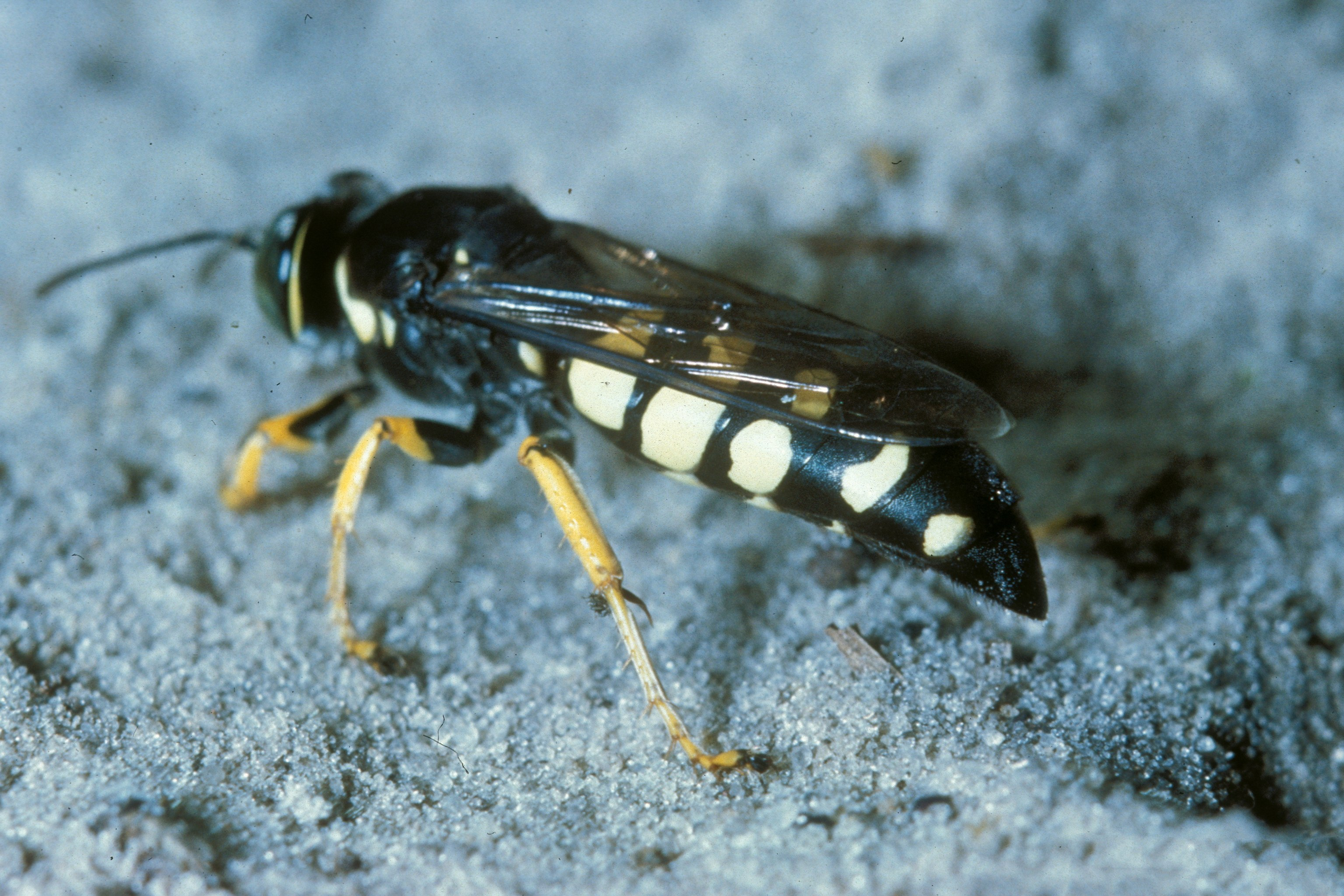
The horse guard wasp, Stictia carolina, catches horse flies to provision its brood in a nest.

Eggs are often attacked by tiny parasitic wasps, and the larvae are consumed by birds, as well as being paratised by tachinid flies, fungi, and nematodes. Adults are eaten by generalized predators such as birds, and some specialist predators, such as the horse guard wasp (a bembicinid wasp), also preferentially attack horse-flies, catching them to provision their nests.

=== As disease vectors ===
Tabanids are known vectors for some blood-borne bacterial, viral, protozoan, and worm diseases of mammals, such as the equine infectious anaemia virus and various species of Trypanosoma which cause diseases in animals and humans. Species of the genus Chrysops transmit the parasitic filarial worm Loa loa between humans, and tabanids are known to transmit anthrax among cattle and sheep, and tularemia between rabbits and humans.

Blood loss is a common problem in some animals when large flies are abundant. Some animals have been known to lose up to 300 ml (11 imp fl oz; 10 US fl oz) of blood in a single day to tabanid flies, a loss which can weaken or even kill them. Anecdotal reports of bites leading to fatal anaphylaxis in humans have been made, an extremely rare occurrence.

=== Management ===
Control of tabanid flies is difficult. Malaise traps are most often used to capture them, and these can be modified with the use of baits and attractants that include carbon dioxide or octenol. A dark shiny ball suspended below them that moves in the breeze can also attract them and forms a key part of a modified "Manitoba trap" that is used most often for trapping and sampling the Tabanidae. Cattle can be treated with pour-on pyrethroids which may repel the flies, and fitting them with insecticide-impregnated eartags or collars has had some success in killing the insects.

== Bites ==
Tabanid bites can be painful to humans. Usually, a weal (raised area of skin) occurs around the site; other symptoms may include urticaria (a rash), dizziness, weakness, wheezing, and angioedema (a temporary itchy, pink or red swelling occurring around the eyes or lips). A few people experience an allergic reaction. The National Health Service of the United Kingdom recommends that the site of the bite should be washed and a cold compress applied. Scratching the wound should be avoided at all times and an antihistamine preparation can be applied. In most cases, the symptoms subside within a few hours, but if the wound becomes infected, medical advice should be sought.

The health effects of the bites come from several sources; the mechanical damage to the tissue and blood vessels, the risk of infection, and the effects of the insect's saliva which is rich in anticoagulants evolved to keep the blood flowing. It is thought that these proteins are responsible for the allergic and anaphylactic reactions as well as local inflammation and histamine release.

== In literature ==
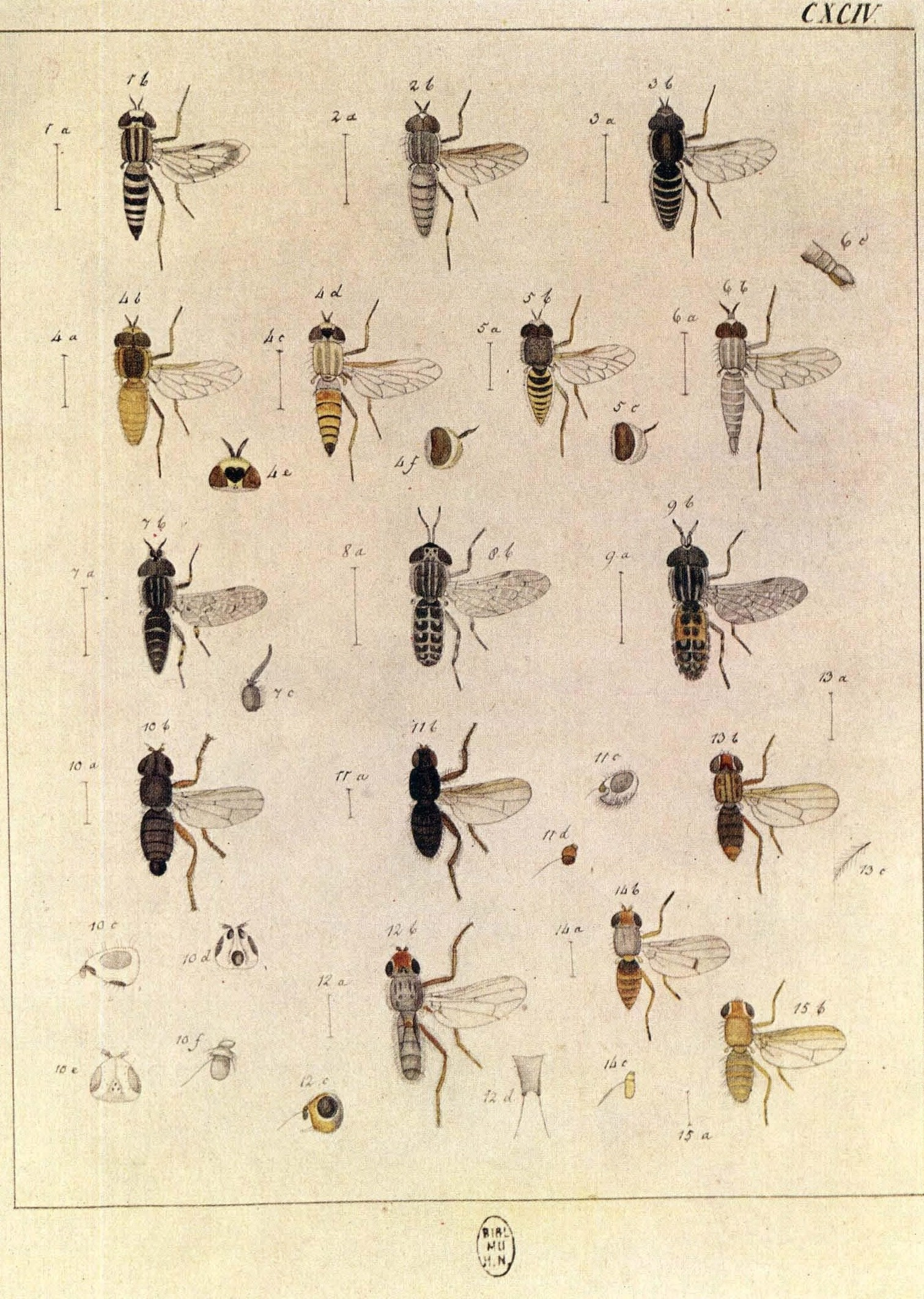
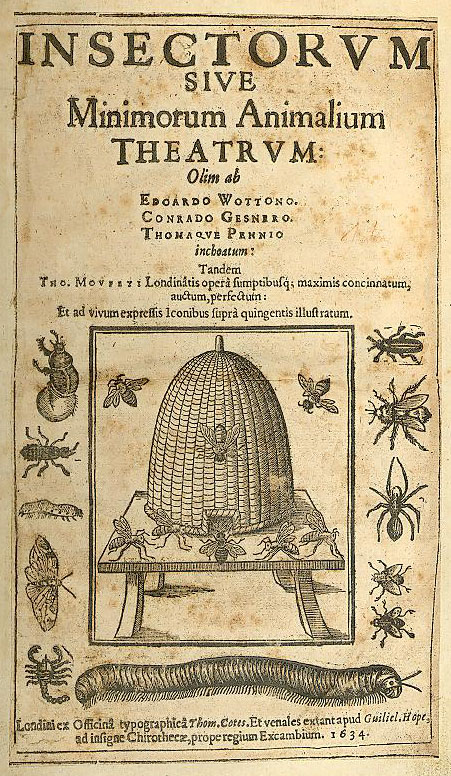
Left: Johann Wilhelm Meigen's Europäischen Zweiflügeligen 1790, Plate CXCIV. Nos 7, 8 and 9 are Haematopota horse-flies, H. crassicornis, H. grandis, and H. pluvialis, respectively.
Right: Thomas Muffett described the horse-fly in his 1634 book Theatre of Insects.

In Prometheus Bound, which is attributed to the Athenian tragic playwright Aeschylus, a gadfly sent by Zeus's wife Hera pursues and torments his mistress Io, who has been transformed into a cow and is watched constantly by the hundred eyes of the herdsman Argus: "Io: Ah! Hah! Again the prick, the stab of gadfly-sting! O earth, earth, hide, the hollow shape—Argus—that evil thing—the hundred-eyed." William Shakespeare, inspired by Aeschylus, has Tom o' Bedlam in King Lear, "Whom the foul fiend hath led through fire and through flame, through ford and whirlpool, o'er bog and quagmire", driven mad by the constant pursuit. In Antony and Cleopatra, Shakespeare likens Cleopatra's hasty departure from the Actium battlefield to that of a cow chased by a gadfly: "The breeze [gadfly] upon her, like a cow in June / hoists sail and flies", where "June" may allude not only to the month but also to the goddess Juno, who torments Io, and the cow in turn may allude to Io, who is changed into a cow in Ovid's Metamorphoses.

The physician and naturalist Thomas Muffet wrote that the horse fly "carries before him a very hard, stiff, and well-compacted sting, with which he strikes through the Oxe his hide; he is in fashion like a great Fly, and forces the beasts for fear of him only to stand up to the belly in water, or else to betake themselves to wood sides, cool shades, and places where the wind blows through." The "Blue Tail Fly" in the eponymous song was probably the mourning horsefly (Tabanus atratus), a tabanid with a blue-black abdomen common to the southeastern United States.

Paul Muldoon's chapbook Binge contains a poem "Clegs and Midges" which uses gadflies, real and metaphoric, "cleg" being a British term for the horse fly.

In Norse mythology Loki took the form of a gadfly to hinder Brokkr during the manufacture of the hammer Mjölnir, weapon of Thor (Hammer of Thor).

== See also ==
- List of soldierflies and allies of Great Britain
- Use of DNA in forensic entomology
