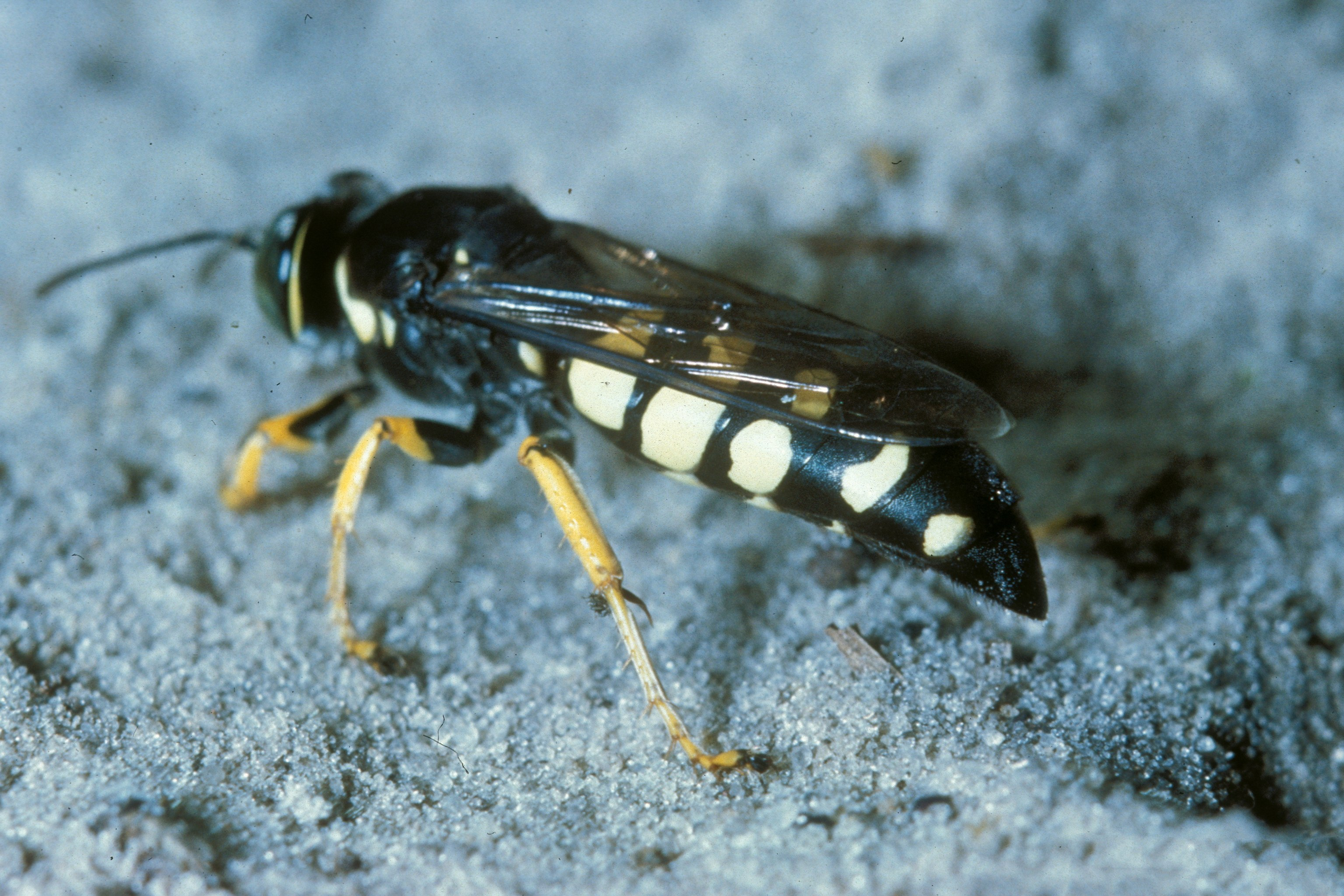

Scientific classification
- Domain: Eukaryota
- Kingdom: Animalia
- Phylum: Arthropoda
- Class: Insecta
- Order: Hymenoptera
- Family: Bembicidae
- Genus: Stictia
- Species: S. carolina

Binomial name
- Stictia carolina Fabricius, 1793

= Horse guard wasp =

Horse guard

Species of wasp

The horse guard wasp (Stictia carolina) is a type of sand wasp (Bembicini) from the eastern United States which preys primarily upon horse-flies (Tabanidae). It is a large, colorful, fast-flying wasp, one of 28 species in the genus Stictia (which occur throughout North and South America), all of which have similar biology.

== Biology ==
A female wasp of this species may take anywhere from 30 to 60 flies as food to provision each one of her nests; she makes a new nest for every egg she lays. Nests are simple burrows some 15 cm deep, with a single enlarged chamber at the bottom. An egg is laid in the empty chamber, and the female wasp brings back paralyzed flies and sometimes silver-spotted skipper larvae until the chamber is full (mass provisioning), at which point she closes the nest and begins another. Numerous females often excavate nests within a small area where the soil is suitable, creating large and sometimes very dense nesting aggregations. Nearly all the prey are biting female horse-flies; exceptionally, other flies such as Odontomyia and the screw-worm fly Cochliomyia are taken.

Horses and cattle are not disturbed by the presence of the horse guard wasp, despite its rapid flight and loud buzzing; the same animals may however respond strongly to horse-flies or bot flies. Nonetheless, these beneficial wasps are sometimes eliminated by horse owners unfamiliar with them, thus exacerbating their problems with horse-flies.

The horse guard wasp acts as a natural biological control, helping to keep horse fly populations down. This makes it important to the economies of those areas where horses are reared; in the words of Bohart and Menke, it "fully lives up to its name".

The generic name "Stictia" may be related to Ancient Greek "stictis" which means "spotted"; the specific name "carolina" is a reference to the eastern American state to which this species is native. It occurs from the 100th meridian eastwards, and as far north as Pennsylvania.
