= List of Bembecinus species =

This is a list of 199 species in Bembecinus, a genus of sand wasps in the family Bembicidae.

== Bembecinus species ==
- Bembecinus abmedius R. Bohart, 1997^{i c g}
- Bembecinus acanthomerus (Morice, 1911)^{i c g}
- Bembecinus adeni (Schmid-Egger, 2004)^{i c g}
- Bembecinus aemulus (Handlirsch, 1895)^{i c g}
- Bembecinus agilis (F. Smith, 1873)^{i c g}
- Bembecinus alternatus van der Vecht, 1949^{i c g}
- Bembecinus anatolicus de Beaumont, 1968^{i c g}
- Bembecinus angustifrons (Arnold, 1940)^{i c g}
- Bembecinus anthracinus (Handlirsch, 1892)^{i c g}
- Bembecinus antipodum (Handlirsch, 1892)^{i c g}
- Bembecinus argentifrons (F. Smith, 1856)^{i c g}
- Bembecinus asiaticus Gussakovskij, 1935^{i c g}
- Bembecinus asphaltites de Beaumont, 1968^{i}
- Bembecinus assentator (Arnold, 1945)^{i c g}
- Bembecinus asuncionis (Strand, 1910)^{i c g}
- Bembecinus ater R. Bohart, 1996^{i c g}
- Bembecinus atratus (Arnold, 1936)^{i c g}
- Bembecinus barbarus (de Beaumont, 1950)^{i c g}
- Bembecinus berlandi Willink, 1952^{i c g}
- Bembecinus bernardi de Beaumont, 1954^{i c g}
- Bembecinus bicinctus (Taschenberg, 1875)^{i c g}
- Bembecinus bidens (Arnold, 1933)^{i c g}
- Bembecinus bimaculatus (Matsumura and Uchida, 1926)^{i c g}
- Bembecinus birecikensis Schmid-Egger, 2004^{i c g}
- Bembecinus bishoppi Krombein and Willink, 1951^{i c g}
- Bembecinus boer (Handlirsch, 1900)^{i c g}
- Bembecinus borneanus (Cameron, 1903)^{i c g}
- Bembecinus bridarollii Willink, 1949^{i c g}
- Bembecinus brooksi R. Bohart, 1997^{i c g}
- Bembecinus broomfieldi Krombein, 1984^{i c g}
- Bembecinus buyssoni (Arnold, 1929)^{i c g}
- Bembecinus bytinskii de Beaumont, 1954^{i c g}
- Bembecinus caffer (de Saussure, 1854)^{i c g}
- Bembecinus carinatus Lohrmann, 1942^{i c g}
- Bembecinus carpetanus (Mercet, 1906)^{i c g}
- Bembecinus chilwae R. Bohart, 1997^{i c g}
- Bembecinus cinguliger (F. Smith, 1856)^{i c g}
- Bembecinus clypearis R. Bohart, 1996^{i c g}
- Bembecinus comberi (R. Turner, 1912)^{i c g}
- Bembecinus comechingon Willink, 1949^{i c g}
- Bembecinus consobrinus (Handlirsch, 1892)^{i c g}
- Bembecinus corpulentus (Arnold, 1929)^{i c g}
- Bembecinus crassipes (Handlirsch, 1895)^{i c g}
- Bembecinus cyprius de Beaumont, 1954^{i c g}
- Bembecinus damarensis F. Gess and Pulawski, 2015^{i g}
- Bembecinus decoratus Guichard, 1980^{i c g}
- Bembecinus dentiventris (Handlirsch, 1895)^{i c g}
- Bembecinus discolor (Handlirsch, 1892)^{i c g}
- Bembecinus distinctus (Arnold, 1955)^{i c g}
- Bembecinus egens (Handlirsch, 1892)^{i c g}
- Bembecinus escalerae (R. Turner, 1912)^{i c g}
- Bembecinus facialis (Handlirsch, 1892)^{i c g}
- Bembecinus fertoni (Handlirsch, 1908)^{i c g}
- Bembecinus flavipes (F. Smith, 1856)^{i c g}
- Bembecinus flavopictus (Arnold, 1936)^{i c g}
- Bembecinus flexuosefasciatus (Mantero, 1917)^{i c g}
- Bembecinus floridanus Krombein & Willink, 1951^{i c g b}
- Bembecinus fraterculus (Arnold, 1929)^{i c g}
- Bembecinus gariepensis F. Gess and Pulawski, 2015^{i g}
- Bembecinus gazagnairei (Handlirsch, 1892)^{i c g}
- Bembecinus gilvus R. Bohart, 1997^{i c g}
- Bembecinus gorytoides (Handlirsch, 1895)^{i c g}
- Bembecinus gracilicornis (Handlirsch, 1892)^{i c g}
- Bembecinus gracilis (von Schulthess, 1893)^{i c g}
- Bembecinus guichardi Schmid-Egger, 2004^{i c g}
- Bembecinus gusenleitneri de Beaumont, 1967^{i c g}
- Bembecinus gynandromorphus (Handlirsch, 1892)^{i c g}
- Bembecinus haemorrhoidalis (Handlirsch, 1900)^{i c g}
- Bembecinus haplocerus (Handlirsch, 1895)^{i c g}
- Bembecinus hebraeus de Beaumont, 1968^{i c g}
- Bembecinus heinrichi Schmid-Egger, 2004^{i c g}
- Bembecinus helicicola Pulawski, 2015^{i g}
- Bembecinus henseni Schmid-Egger, 2004^{i c g}
- Bembecinus herbsti (Arnold, 1929)^{i c g}
- Bembecinus hirtiusculus (Arnold, 1945)^{i c g}
- Bembecinus hirtulus (F. Smith, 1856)^{i c g}
- Bembecinus hoplites (Handlirsch, 1892)^{i c g}
- Bembecinus hungaricus (Frivaldszky, 1876)^{i c g}
- Bembecinus hyperocrus (Arnold, 1929)^{i c g}
- Bembecinus inermis (Handlirsch, 1892)^{i c g}
- Bembecinus inexspectatus Pulawski, 2015^{i g}
- Bembecinus innocens de Beaumont, 1967^{i c g}
- Bembecinus insulanus de Beaumont, 1954^{i c g}
- Bembecinus insularis (Handlirsch, 1892)^{i c g}
- Bembecinus iranicus Schmid-Egger, 2004^{i g}
- Bembecinus irwini R. Bohart, 1997^{i c g}
- Bembecinus jacksoni (Arnold, 1955)^{i c g}
- Bembecinus javanus (Handlirsch, 1892)^{i c g}
- Bembecinus kachelibae (Arnold, 1960)^{i c g}
- Bembecinus karasanus F. Gess and Pulawski, 2015^{i g}
- Bembecinus karooensis (Arnold, 1936)^{i c g}
- Bembecinus khuzestani Schmid-Egger, 2004^{i c g}
- Bembecinus knighti Krombein, 1984^{i c g}
- Bembecinus kobrowi (Arnold, 1936)^{i c g}
- Bembecinus kotschyi (Handlirsch, 1892)^{i c g}
- Bembecinus krameri Krombein, 1984^{i c g}
- Bembecinus kuehlhorni Willink, 1953^{c g}
- Bembecinus kuelhorni Willink, 1953^{i}
- Bembecinus lateralis (Bingham, 1897)^{i c g}
- Bembecinus laterimacula (Handlirsch, 1895)^{i c g}
- Bembecinus laticaudatus (Arnold, 1929)^{i c g}
- Bembecinus laticinctus (Arnold, 1929)^{i c g}
- Bembecinus latifascia (Walker, 1871)^{i c g}
- Bembecinus lavongaianus Tsuneki, 1982^{i c g}
- Bembecinus littoralis van der Vecht, 1949^{i c g}
- Bembecinus lomii (Guiglia, 1941)^{i c g}
- Bembecinus loriculatus (F. Smith, 1856)^{i c g}
- Bembecinus luteolus Krombein, 1984^{i c g}
- Bembecinus maior (Handlirsch, 1895)^{i c g}
- Bembecinus manusensis Tsuneki, 1982^{i c g}
- Bembecinus mattheyi (de Beaumont, 1951)^{i c g}
- Bembecinus mayri (Handlirsch, 1892)^{i c g}
- Bembecinus meridionalis A. Costa, 1859^{i c g}
- Bembecinus mexicanus (Handlirsch, 1892)^{i c g}
- Bembecinus mhamidus Schmid-Egger, 2004^{i c g}
- Bembecinus mirus (Arnold, 1945)^{i c g}
- Bembecinus mitulus (Arnold, 1929)^{i c g}
- Bembecinus modestus (F. Smith, 1860)^{i c g}
- Bembecinus moneduloides (F. Smith, 1856)^{i c g}
- Bembecinus monodi (Berland, 1950)^{i c g}
- Bembecinus monodon (Handlirsch, 1895)^{i c g}
- Bembecinus multiguttatus (Arnold, 1951)^{i c g}
- Bembecinus mutabilis (Arnold, 1929)^{i c g}
- Bembecinus naefi (de Beaumont, 1951)^{i c g}
- Bembecinus namaquensis Pulawski, 2015^{i g}
- Bembecinus nambui Tsuneki, 1973^{i c g}
- Bembecinus namibicus R. Bohart, 1997^{i c g}
- Bembecinus namibius Pulawski, 2015^{i g}
- Bembecinus nanus (Handlirsch, 1892)^{i c g}
- Bembecinus neglectus (Cresson, 1873)^{i c g b}
- Bembecinus nemoralis (Arnold, 1960)^{i c g}
- Bembecinus niehuisi Schmid-Egger, 2004^{i c g}
- Bembecinus nigriclypeus (Sonan, 1928)^{i c g}
- Bembecinus nigrolabrum Schmid-Egger, 2004^{i c g}
- Bembecinus novabritanicus Tsuneki, 1982^{i c g}
- Bembecinus nyamadanus Tsuneki, 1974^{i c g}
- Bembecinus nyasae (R. Turner, 1912)^{i c g}
- Bembecinus omaruru Pulawski, 2015^{i g}
- Bembecinus oxydorcus (Handlirsch, 1900)^{i c g}
- Bembecinus paiwanus Tsuneki, 1977^{i c g}
- Bembecinus pakhuisae R. Bohart, 1997^{i c g}
- Bembecinus pallidicinctus van der Vecht, 1949^{i c g}
- Bembecinus papuanus (Cameron, 1906)^{i c g}
- Bembecinus penpuchiensis Tsuneki, 1968^{i c g}
- Bembecinus peregrinus (F. Smith, 1856)^{i c g}
- Bembecinus philippinensis Tsuneki, 1992^{i c g}
- Bembecinus podager (de Beaumont, 1951)^{i c g}
- Bembecinus polychromus (Handlirsch, 1895)^{i c g}
- Bembecinus posterus (Sonan, 1928)^{i c g}
- Bembecinus priesneri Schmid-Egger, 2004^{c g}
- Bembecinus prismaticus (F. Smith, 1858)^{i c g}
- Bembecinus proteus (Arnold, 1929)^{i c g}
- Bembecinus proximus (Handlirsch, 1892)^{i c g}
- Bembecinus pulchellus (Mercet, 1906)^{i c g}
- Bembecinus pusillus (Handlirsch, 1892)^{i c g}
- Bembecinus quadratus Tsuneki, 1976^{i c g}
- Bembecinus quadristrigatus (Arnold, 1929)^{i c g}
- Bembecinus quinquespinosus (Say, 1823)^{i c g b}
- Bembecinus rectilateralis (Arnold, 1945)^{i c g}
- Bembecinus remanei Schmid-Egger, 2004^{i c g}
- Bembecinus reticulatus Tsuneki, 1976^{i c g}
- Bembecinus reversus (F. Smith, 1856)^{i c g}
- Bembecinus revindicatus (W. Schulz, 1906)^{i c g}
- Bembecinus rhodius de Beaumont, 1960^{i c g}
- Bembecinus rhopaloceroides (Arnold, 1929)^{i c g}
- Bembecinus rhopalocerus (Handlirsch, 1895)^{i c g}
- Bembecinus rozenorum R. Bohart, 1997^{i c g}
- Bembecinus ruficaudus R. Bohart, 1997^{c g}
- Bembecinus schlaeflei Schmid-Egger, 2004^{i c g}
- Bembecinus schwarzi de Beaumont, 1967^{i c g}
- Bembecinus semperi (Handlirsch, 1892)^{i c g}
- Bembecinus signatus (Handlirsch, 1892)^{i c g}
- Bembecinus simillimus (F. Smith, 1859)^{i c g}
- Bembecinus sipapomae (Arnold, 1929)^{i c g}
- Bembecinus solitarius (Arnold, 1936)^{i c g}
- Bembecinus somalicus (Arnold, 1940)^{i g}
- Bembecinus spinicornis (de Saussure, 1887)^{i c g}
- Bembecinus spinifemur (de Beaumont, 1951)^{i c g}
- Bembecinus stevensoni (Arnold, 1936)^{i c g}
- Bembecinus strenuus (Mickel, 1918)^{i c g}
- Bembecinus suada (F. Smith, 1865)^{i}
- Bembecinus suadus (F. Smith, 1865)^{c g}
- Bembecinus sudanensis (Arnold, 1951)^{i c g}
- Bembecinus tanoi Tsuneki, 1971^{i c g}
- Bembecinus tenellus (Klug, 1845)^{i c g}
- Bembecinus tinkeri R. Bohart, 1997^{i c g}
- Bembecinus trichionotus (Cameron, 1913)^{i c g}
- Bembecinus tridens (Fabricius, 1781)^{i c g}
- Bembecinus turneri (Froggatt, 1917)^{i c g}
- Bembecinus urfanensis Schmid-Egger, 2004^{i c g}
- Bembecinus validior Gussakovskij, 1952^{i c g}
- Bembecinus veniperdus Lohrmann, 1942^{i c g}
- Bembecinus versicolor (Handlirsch, 1892)^{i c g}
- Bembecinus wenzeli R. Bohart, 1997^{i c g}
- Bembecinus wheeleri Krombein and Willink, 1951^{i c g}
- Bembecinus witzenbergensis (Arnold, 1929)^{i c g}
- Bembecinus yemenensis Schmid-Egger, 2009^{i c g}
- Bembecinus zebratus R. Bohart, 1997^{i c g}
- Bembecinus zibanensis (Morice, 1911)^{i c g}

Data sources: i = ITIS, c = Catalogue of Life, g = GBIF, b = Bugguide.net
