= List of Stizus species =

This is a list of 109 species in the genus Stizus, sand wasps in the family Bembicidae.

== Stizus species ==
- Stizus adelphus W.F. Kirby, 1900^{i c g}
- Stizus aegyptius Lepeletier, 1845^{i c g}
- Stizus aestivalis Mercet, 1906^{i c g}
- Stizus anchoratus Mantero, 1917^{i c g}
- Stizus annulatus (Klug, 1845)^{i c g}
- Stizus apicalis Guérin-Méneville, 1844^{i c g}
- Stizus arabicus Guichard, 1989^{i c g}
- Stizus arnoldi Mochi, 1939^{i c g}
- Stizus atrox (F. Smith, 1856)^{i c g}
- Stizus aurifluus R. Turner, 1916^{i c g}
- Stizus aztecus Stubblefield, 1984^{i c g}
- Stizus basalis Guérin-Méneville, 1844^{i c g}
- Stizus baumanni Handlirsch, 1901^{i c g}
- Stizus beccarii Mantero, 1917^{i c g}
- Stizus bensoni Arnold, 1951^{i c g}
- Stizus berlandi Arnold, 1945^{i c g}
- Stizus biclipeatus (Christ, 1791)^{i c g}
- Stizus bipunctatus (F. Smith, 1856)^{i c g}
- Stizus bizonatus Spinola, 1839^{i c g}
- Stizus brevipennis Walsh, 1869^{i c g b}
- Stizus breyeri Arnold, 1936^{i c g}
- Stizus chrysorrhoeus Handlirsch, 1892^{i c g}
- Stizus cinctus (Fabricius, 1793)^{i c g}
- Stizus coloratus Nurse, 1903^{i c g}
- Stizus combustus (F. Smith, 1856)^{i c g}
- Stizus continuus (Klug, 1835)^{i c g}
- Stizus delessertii Guérin-Méneville, 1844^{i c g}
- Stizus deserticus Giner Marí, 1945^{i c g}
- Stizus dewitzii Handlirsch, 1892^{i c g}
- Stizus dispar F. Morawitz, 1888^{i c g}
- Stizus elegans Dahlbom, 1845^{i c g}
- Stizus ellenbergeri Arnold, 1929^{i c g}
- Stizus emir Handlirsch, 1901^{i c g}
- Stizus erythraeensis Mantero, 1917^{i c g}
- Stizus erythrocephalus (Fabricius, 1793)^{i c g}
- Stizus euchromus Handlirsch, 1892^{i c g}
- Stizus excellens Lohrmann, 1943^{i c g}
- Stizus eximius F. Morawitz, 1894^{i c g}
- Stizus fasciatus (Fabricius, 1781)^{i c g}
- Stizus fedtschenkoi Radoszkowski, 1877^{i c g}
- Stizus ferrandii Magretti, 1899^{i c g}
- Stizus franzi R. Turner, 1916^{i c g}
- Stizus fulvicornis Dahlbom, 1845^{i c g}
- Stizus fuscatus Morice, 1897^{i c g}
- Stizus fuscipennis (F. Smith, 1856)^{i c g}
- Stizus hamatus Arnold, 1929^{i c g}
- Stizus handlirschi Radoszkowski, 1893^{i c g}
- Stizus hispanicus Mocsáry, 1883^{i c g}
- Stizus histrio F. Morawitz, 1888^{i c g}
- Stizus huegelii Handlirsch, 1892^{i c g}
- Stizus hyalipennis Handlirsch, 1892^{i c g}
- Stizus imperator Nurse, 1903^{i c g}
- Stizus imperialis Handlirsch, 1892^{i c g}
- Stizus iridis Dow, 1941^{i c g}
- Stizus jordanicus Lohrmann, 1942^{i c g}
- Stizus koenigi F. Morawitz, 1888^{i c g}
- Stizus kohlii Mocsáry, 1883^{i c g}
- Stizus lacteipennis Mocsáry, 1883^{i c g}
- Stizus lepidus (Klug, 1845)^{i c g}
- Stizus lineatus (Fabricius, 1793)^{i c}
- Stizus lohrmanni R. Bohart, 1976^{i c g}
- Stizus lughensis Magretti, 1899^{i c g}
- Stizus luteotaeniatus Gussakovskij, 1933^{i c g}
- Stizus marnonis Handlirsch, 1892^{i c g}
- Stizus marshallii R. Turner, 1912^{i c g}
- Stizus marthae Handlirsch, 1892^{i c g}
- Stizus melanurus Handlirsch, 1892^{i c g}
- Stizus mocsaryi Handlirsch, 1895^{i c g}
- Stizus multicolor R. Turner, 1916^{i c g}
- Stizus nadigi Roth, 1933^{i c g}
- Stizus neavei R. Turner, 1912^{i c g}
- Stizus nigriventris Arnold, 1951^{i c g}
- Stizus niloticus Handlirsch, 1892^{i c g}
- Stizus occidentalis J. Parker, 1929^{i c g b}
- Stizus ocellatus Gistel, 1857^{i c g}
- Stizus orientalis Cameron, 1890^{i c g}
- Stizus ornatus Dahlbom, 1845^{i c g}
- Stizus pauli Mantero, 1917^{i c g}
- Stizus perrisi Dufour, 1838^{i c g}
- Stizus pictus Dahlbom, 1845^{i c g}
- Stizus praestans F. Morawitz, 1893^{i c g}
- Stizus pubescens (Klug, 1835)^{i c g}
- Stizus quartinae Gribodo, 1884^{i c g}
- Stizus raddei Handlirsch in Kohl and Handlirsch, 1889^{c g}
- Stizus rapax Handlirsch, 1892^{i c g}
- Stizus richardsi Arnold, 1959^{i c g}
- Stizus rubellus R. Turner, 1912^{i c g}
- Stizus rubroflavus R. Turner, 1916^{i c g}
- Stizus rufescens (F. Smith, 1856)^{i c g}
- Stizus ruficornis (J. Forster, 1771)^{i c g}
- Stizus rufipes (Fabricius, 1804)^{i c g}
- Stizus rufiventris Radoszkowski, 1877^{i c g}
- Stizus rufocinctus Dahlbom, 1845^{i c g}
- Stizus rufoniger Mochi, 1939^{i c g}
- Stizus saussurei Handlirsch, 1895^{i c g}
- Stizus savignyi Spinola, 1839^{i c g}
- Stizus schmiedeknechti Handlirsch, 1898^{i c g}
- Stizus sexfasciatus (Fabricius, 1793)^{i c g}
- Stizus spectrum Handlirsch, 1901^{i c g}
- Stizus spinulosus Radoszkowski, 1876^{i c g}
- Stizus tenuicornis (F. Smith, 1856)^{i c g}
- Stizus texanus Cresson, 1873^{i c g}
- Stizus tricolor Handlirsch, 1892^{i c g}
- Stizus tunetanus A. Costa, 1893^{i c g}
- Stizus vespiformis (Fabricius, 1775)^{i c g}
- Stizus vespoides (Walker, 1871)^{i c g}
- Stizus wheeleri Arnold, 1959^{i c g}
- Stizus zonatus (Klug, 1845)^{i c g}
- Stizus zonosoma Handlirsch, 1895^{i c g}

Data sources: i = ITIS, c = Catalogue of Life, g = GBIF, b = Bugguide.net
