= Bembecinus floridanus =

Scientific classification
- Domain: Eukaryota
- Kingdom: Animalia
- Phylum: Arthropoda
- Class: Insecta
- Order: Hymenoptera
- Family: Bembicidae
- Tribe: Bembicini
- Subtribe: Stizina
- Genus: Bembecinus
- Species: B. floridanus

Binomial name
- Bembecinus floridanus Krombein & Willink, 1951

Synonyms
- Bembecinus nanus floridanus Krombein and Willink, 1951

Species of wasp

Bembecinus floridanus is a species of sand wasp in the family Bembicidae. It is found in North America.
