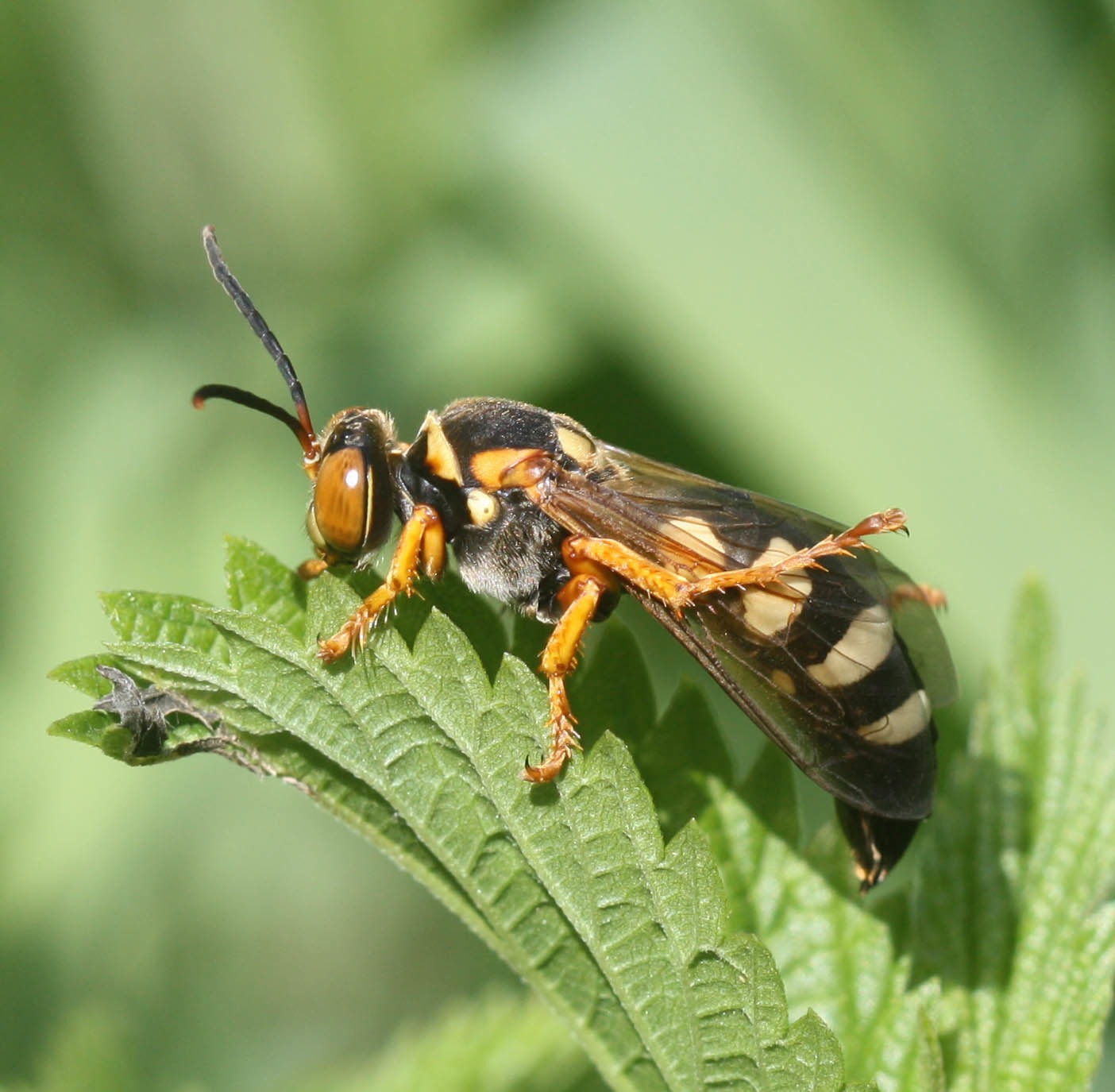
- Stizus brevipennis, South Dakota

Scientific classification
- Domain: Eukaryota
- Kingdom: Animalia
- Phylum: Arthropoda
- Class: Insecta
- Order: Hymenoptera
- Family: Bembicidae
- Tribe: Bembicini
- Subtribe: Stizina
- Genus: Stizus
- Species: S. brevipennis

Binomial name
- Stizus brevipennis Walsh, 1869

Synonyms
- Larra brendeli Taschenberg, 1875

= Stizus brevipennis =

Species of wasp

Stizus brevipennis is a species of sand wasp in the family Bembicidae. It is found in North America.
