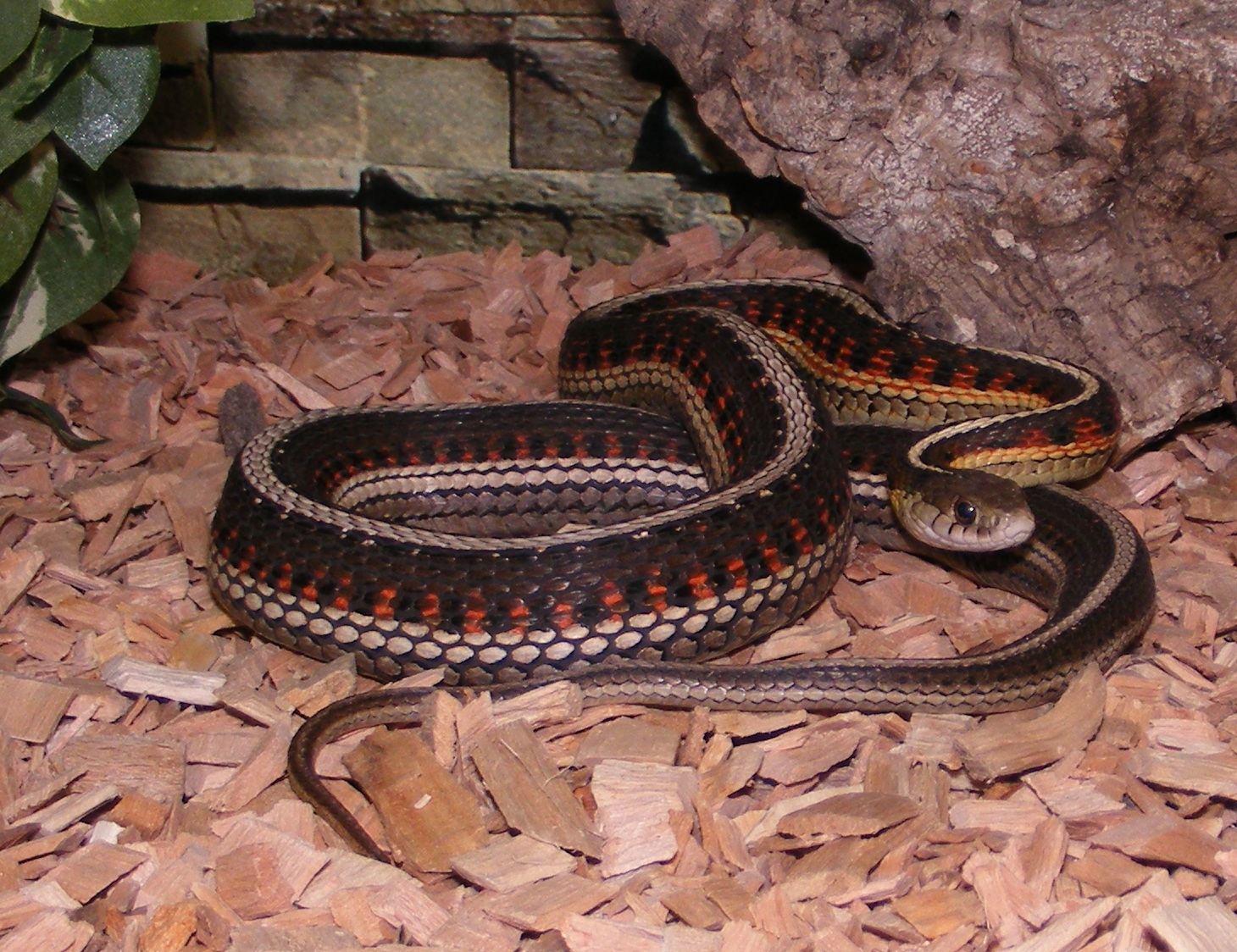

Scientific classification
- Kingdom: Animalia
- Phylum: Chordata
- Class: Reptilia
- Order: Squamata
- Suborder: Serpentes
- Family: Colubridae
- Genus: Thamnophis
- Species: T. sirtalis
- Subspecies: T. s. parietalis

Trinomial name
- Thamnophis sirtalis parietalis (Say, 1823)

Synonyms
- Coluber parietalis Say, 1823

= Red-sided garter snake =

Subspecies of snake

The red-sided garter snake (Thamnophis sirtalis parietalis) is a subspecies of the common garter snake, in the subfamily Natricinae of the family Colubridae. This slender subspecies of natricine snake is indigenous to North America and is one of the recognized subspecies of Thamnophis sirtalis. This subspecies is widely spread across northern United States and southern Canada.

== Appearance ==
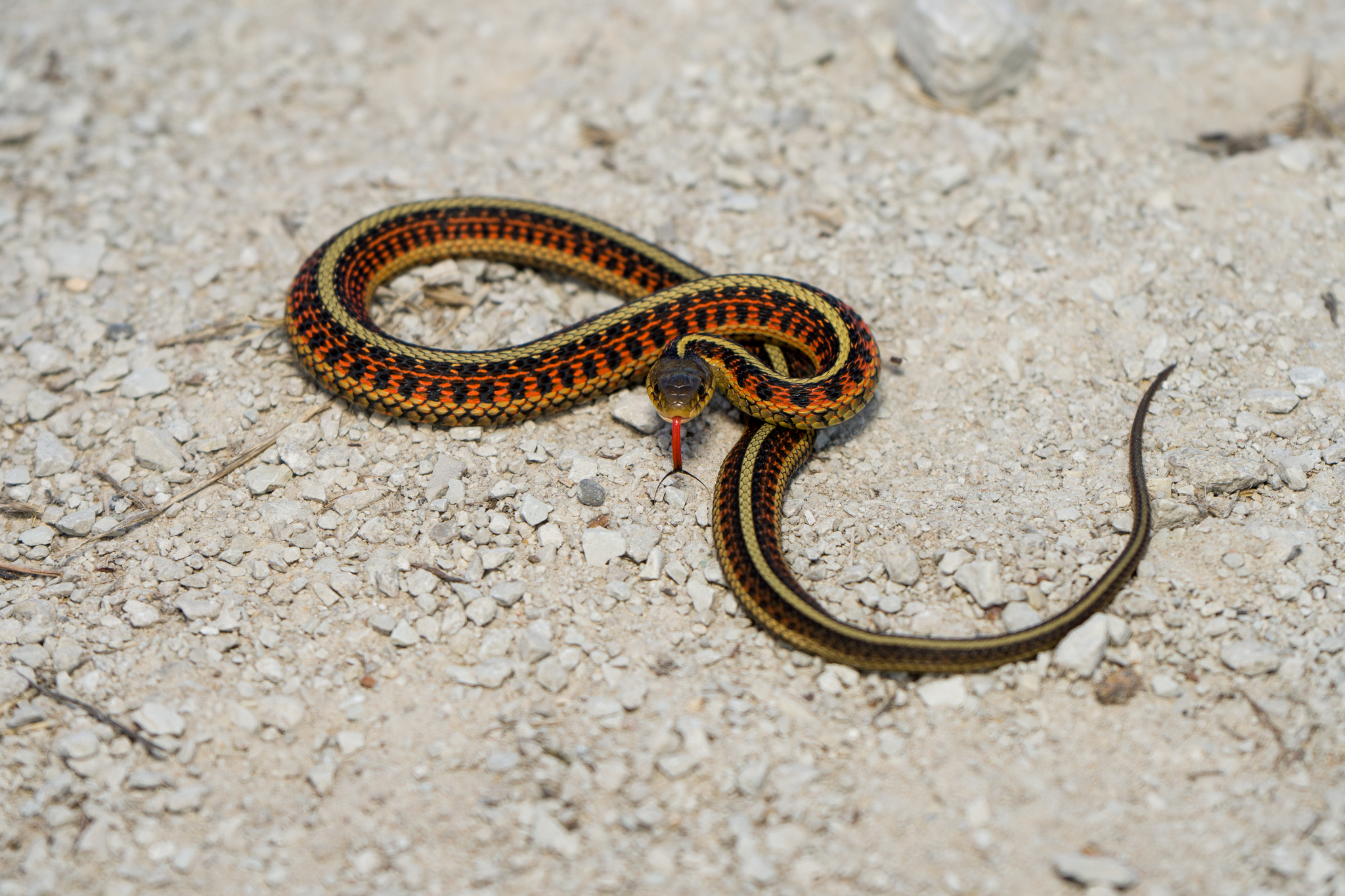
A particularly colourful juvenile

The red-sided garter snakes have an upper row of well-defined red spots, and lower row with patches of red color that smear on the dark area on either side of their back. These snakes have multiple yellow stripes present on their body. Thamnophis sirtalis parietalis is sexually dimorphic, where females are usually larger than males. The females can range from 18 to 24 inches in length, whereas males can grow up to 12 to 18 inches.

The snakes of this subspecies are mainly non-venomous.

== Phenology and habitat use ==
Winter temperatures near their habitat are very harsh and sometimes even drop below zero. During low temperatures in fall and winter, tens of thousands of male and female red-sided garter snakes hibernate together, in a shared underground communal den, for about eight months each year to protect themselves from cold weather and predators. When the temperature rises around 25 °C, it leads to the emergence of these snakes from their dens and triggers mating behavior.

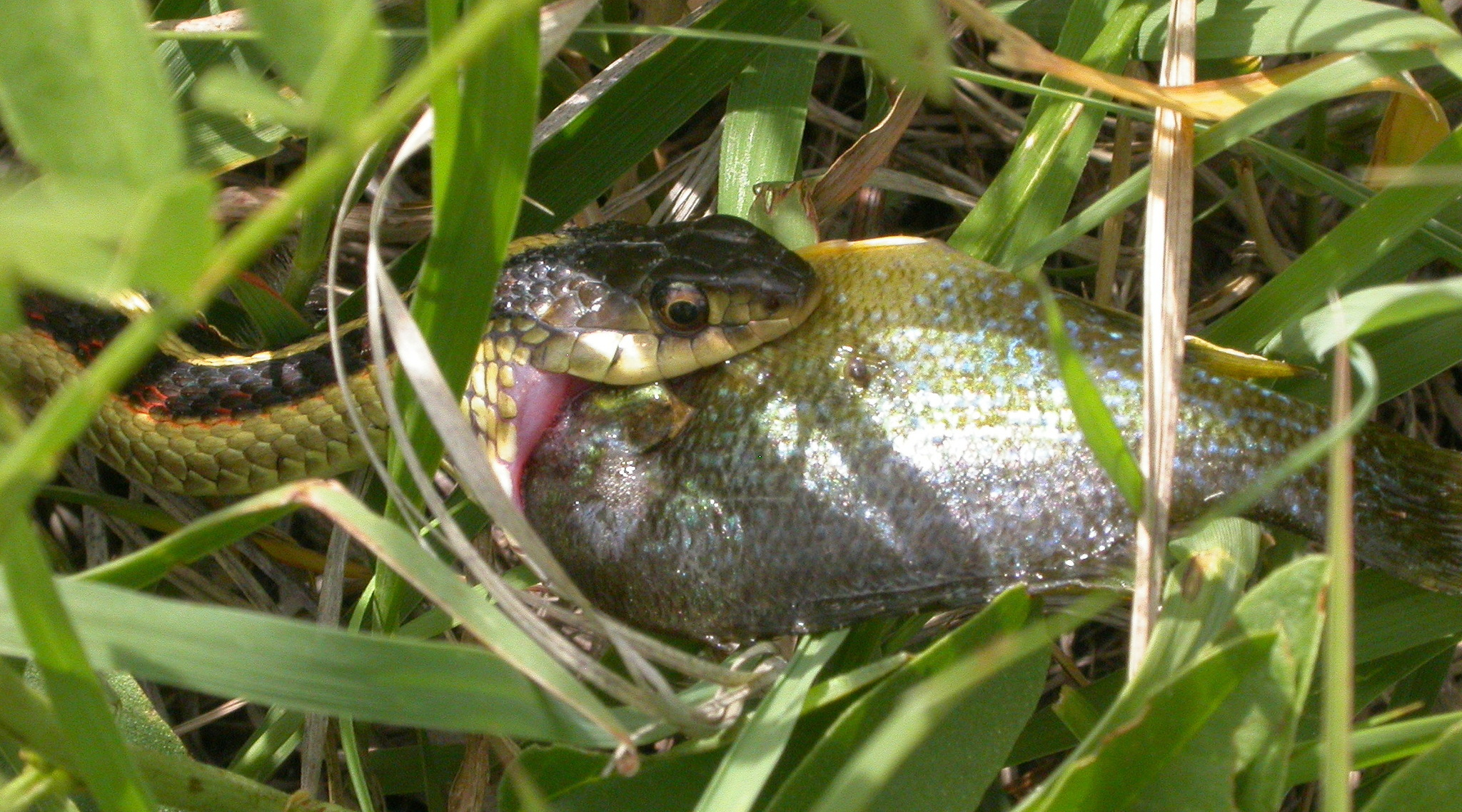
Eating a sunfish

Since food or water is not available close to dens, the snakes migrate to feeding grounds after mating. In summer, the snakes move to mossy or marshy areas where they look for food. Adult snakes feed only for 2 to 3 months during summer, whereas the young ones feed till the start of winter. The adult primarily feed on ranid and wood frogs, and occasionally on mice and voles. The young snakes mostly feed on earthworms. Soon after feeding, close to the end of summer, the adult snakes return to their dens for winter hibernation. The young snakes, around one-year-old, spend more time in marshy areas to find food before the winter temperatures arrive and hibernate there as their small size makes them unnoticeable to predators. During hibernation, the energy stored from summer feeding is used for body growth and maintenance to survive in subzero temperatures for months.

== Reproduction ==
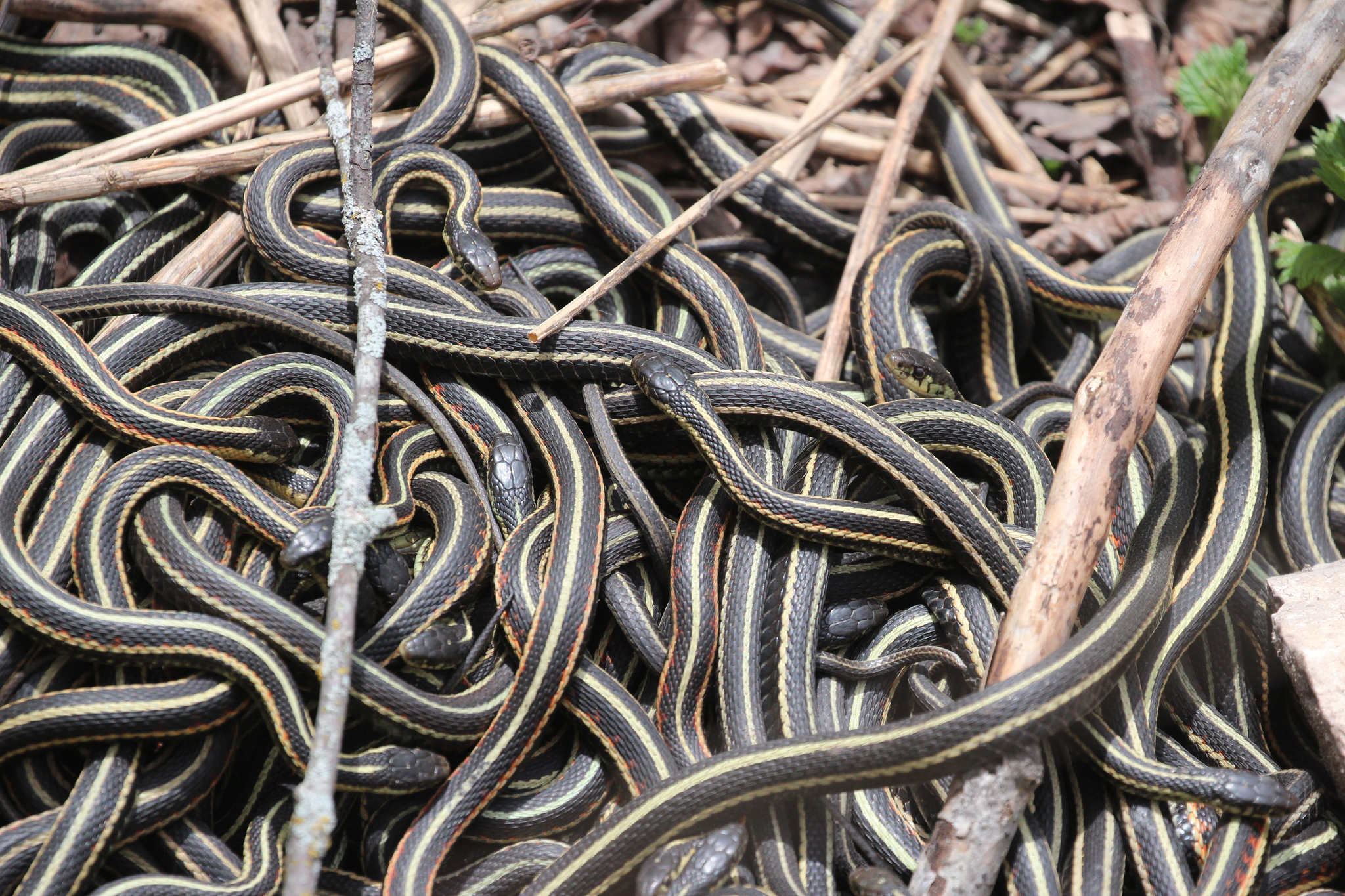
Mating ball, Narcisse Snake Dens

In red-sided garter snakes, the breeding season usually begins in early spring and lasts for about a month. These snakes exhibit a polygynous mating system, which means that males mate with multiple females each season. During the mating season, male snakes form a mating ball near the dens and court females as they emerge. Each female is courted by hundreds of males upon emergence. After mating, males and females move to mossy summer grounds where they find food and water and birth the offspring. These snakes are viviparous and can birth about 30 young ones in one mating season. Gestation period is about 3 to 4 months, and the young ones reach sexual maturity at 1.5 or 2 years of life. In this species, the offspring are usually born before the adults re-enter winter dormancy, and immediately after birth, adult male and female snakes migrate back to their dens and re-enter hibernation in early fall before the temperature falls.

The reproductive system of male snakes includes testicles, epididymis, vas deferens, hemipenes, and renal sex segment. Testes produce sperm that are transported by epididymis to the vas deferens, which then transfer the sperm to hemipenes. These snakes have a double penis with one testis supplying seminal fluid to each hemipenis. Hemipenes are saclike organs that facilitate sperm transfer to the female. During winter, the segment of the vas deferens is used for sperm storage. The function of the renal sex segment is to produce copulatory pheromones and the granules for formation of a copulatory plug. The female reproductive system consists of ovaries, an oviduct, and cloaca. The ovaries and oviducts are long due to the streamlined body of the snake. Multiple follicles (eggs) are present on the elongated ovaries. After mating, it takes up to 6 weeks for sperm to travel through the oviduct and reach the developing follicles in the ovaries.

=== Pre-copulatory behavior ===
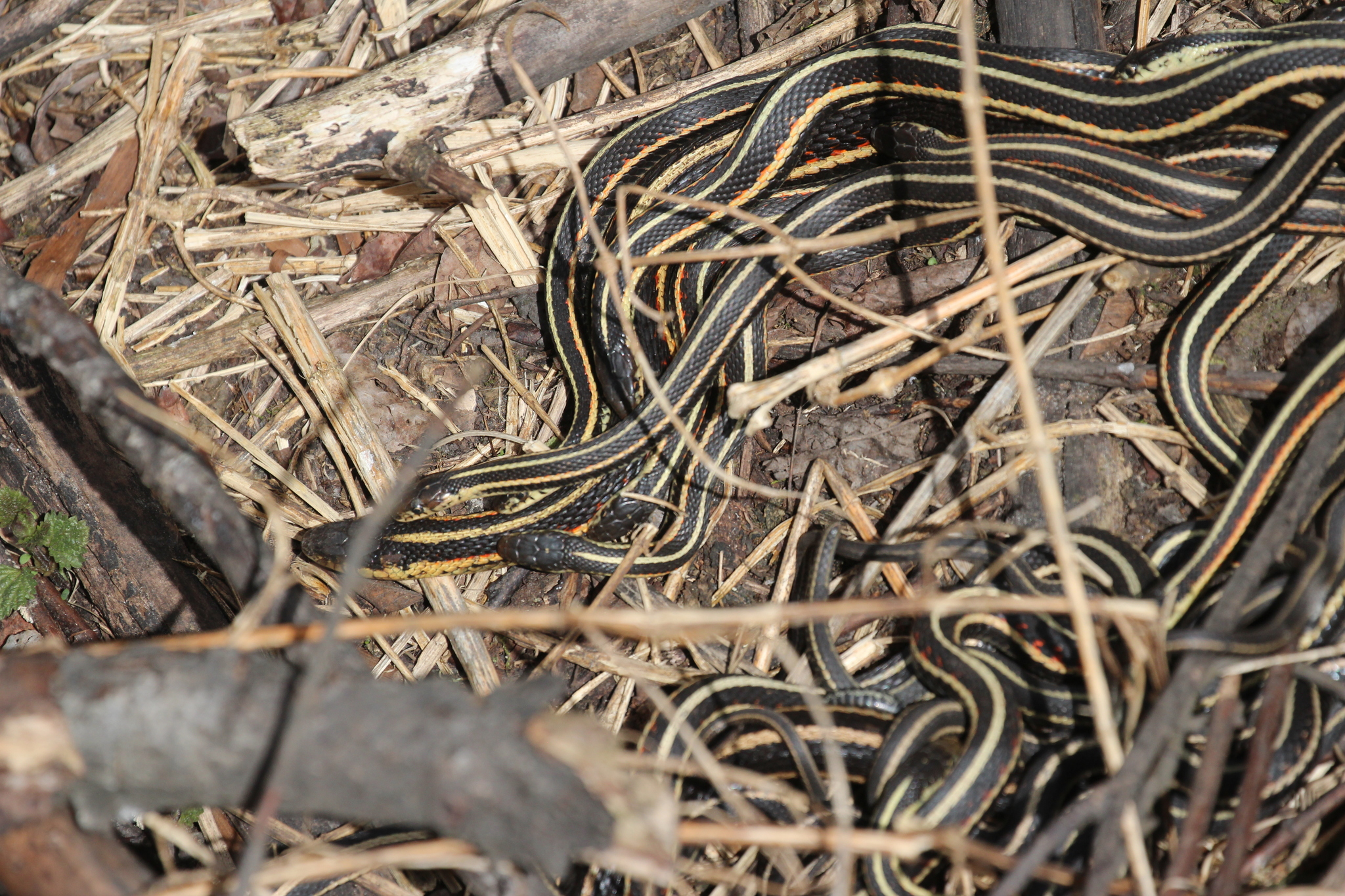
Female courted by smaller males

The behavior and physiology of red-sided garter snakes is heavily influenced by seasonal changes in the environment. Temperature is one of the most crucial factors in regulating the life cycle of this species. During mating season, males emerge first, all together in big groups, whereas females emerge singly or in small groups around 1 to 3 weeks after the emergence of males. When females start to emerge, males begin to form mating balls where they gather around at the opening of the communal dens and start courting the females as soon as they emerge from dormancy. The courtship from males can continue from minutes to hours, but due to vigorous courting from males, females typically mate within 30 minutes after emerging.

==== Mate selection and courtship ====
In T. s. parietalis, mating is largely based on the courtship tactics of males. Males prefer to mate with females who are unmated so they check females for any evidence of previous mating by studying their pheromonal trails for presence of copulatory pheromones or a copulatory plug by tongue-flicking in female cloaca and chin-rubbing to transfer pheromones from skin or cloaca to vomeronasal organ to determine her mating status. Males also display a preference for larger females with longer snout-vent length than smaller females. Increased female body length indirectly correlates to higher sexual receptivity as longer females have higher follicular development, which indicates increased receptivity.

When a male finds a female attractive, male shows increased frequency of tongue-flicking, chin pressing, tail searching, body contractions, caudocephalic waving, and attempts to align his body and cloaca to that of females to increase his mating possibility. However, as the sex ratio during emergence is highly male-biased, it is possible that multiple males court the same females together. This raises intrasexual competition between males and results in male-male combat to secure the mate where males try to keep other males away from the females by 'tail wrestling' in which they insert their tails between the female and other courting males to force them off. Larger males with uninjured basal spine are benefited in such combats as they have longer tails which help them push off smaller males easily. Male who manages to keep his cloaca aligned with female the longest, reaches intromission.

However, female snakes exhibit no preference while choosing a mate. Females do not play active role in courtship or compete for mates, however they do play an important role during intromission and copulation. After the male red-sided garter snake performs courtship behavior, if the female is sexually receptive, she remains steady, breathes rapidly, lifts her tail and gapes her cloacal opening. However, if she is unreceptive, she will reject the advances by strongly vibrating her tail and moving away from the courting males.

=== Mating ===
During intromission, the male attempts to roll up the female's tail with his tail, aligning his cloaca with the female, and widens her cloaca by attaching the hooks at the base of hemipenes to cloacal scales for locking their cloacas together. Then males insert one of their hemipenis bases into the female cloaca and start sperm transfer. After sperm transfer, males deposit a thick translucent gelatinous copulatory plug in the female cloaca that seals the cloaca by attaching the jelly-like substance to the cloacal wall. Average copulation lasts about 15 to 17 minutes, of which eight or more minutes are dedicated for sperm transfer and 2 to 5 minutes for the transfer of plug granules from the renal sex segment that aids in formation of mating plugs.

=== Post-copulatory behavior ===
Sperm competition among males is induced due to copulatory plug, as the primary function of the plug is to prevent re-mating in females by maintaining a reproductive barrier that blocks the female cloacal opening for about 72 hours after mating. Around that time, most females either become unreceptive or start migrating to feeding grounds immediately after mating to avoid any injury or suffocation due to the mass gathering of males, who stay at dens till the end of breeding season. Along with mate-guarding the females, mating plugs also play an important role in initiating transfer of recently deposited sperm, evacuating stored sperm in the oviduct from previous matings, preventing sperm leakage, and acting as antiaphrodisiac in females. After copulation, female attractiveness reduces due to seminal fluid and plug granules ejaculated in the female oviduct, which alters female pheromones that determine their attractiveness and receptivity Fewer males court these females to minimize the time spent on courting females who are not receptive as these changes can be determined by the female's pheromonal trails from miles away. Female attractiveness decreases due to the presence of copulatory pheromones rather than changes in sex-attractiveness pheromones. The duration of release of copulatory pheromones coincides with the duration of a copulatory plug.

=== Sexual conflict ===
In T. s. parietalis, males prefer to have a longer copulatory duration for maximal sperm transfer and formation of a copulatory plug which aids in mate-guarding the female. If copulation lasts longer, males can produce larger plugs to reduce re-mating in females. However, if the quality or quantity of sperm transfer and copulatory plug is not adequate, the frequency of re-mating increases. Copulatory plug mass is also influenced by male body size, female body size, and the number of prior mating in that season. However, females prefer shorter copulation to prevent injury to their reproductive tract, suffocation, exhaustion, and risk of predation. Female genitalia often bleeds during and after copulation as penetration of the basal spine harms cloacal tissues while locking genitals. To shorten the copulatory period, female snakes perform axial rotation and roll their body to disturb cloacal alignment with males. They also use vaginal muscles and cloacal tissues to force males away. Females also avoid large mating aggregations and prefer dens with fewer male pheromones to avoid distress or death due to exhaustion or forcible insemination. Females also display post-copulatory sexual selection by re-mating or using sperm stored from the prior mating season, which increases sperm competition. It is common in red-sided garter snakes to have multiple paternity of offspring mainly by using stored sperm.
