= Stizus occidentalis =

Scientific classification
- Domain: Eukaryota
- Kingdom: Animalia
- Phylum: Arthropoda
- Class: Insecta
- Order: Hymenoptera
- Family: Bembicidae
- Tribe: Bembicini
- Subtribe: Stizina
- Genus: Stizus
- Species: S. occidentalis

Binomial name
- Stizus occidentalis J. Parker, 1929

Species of wasp

Stizus occidentalis is a species of sand wasp in the family Bembicidae. It is found in North America.
