= Mating ball =

Mating behaviour of snakes, toads, and wasps

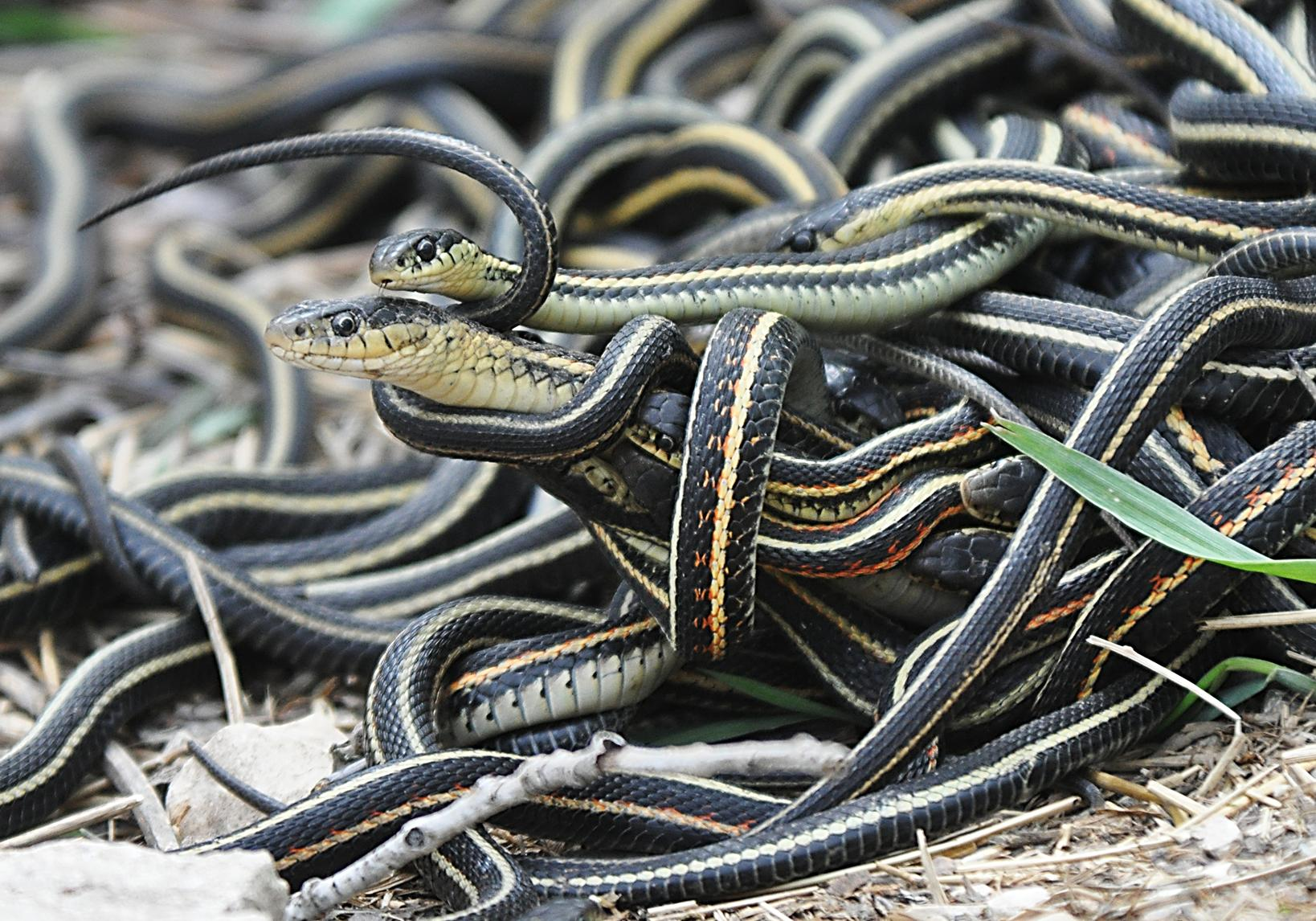
Thamnophis

Mating balls are a brief gregarious structure resulting from a mating behaviour wherein a large number of individuals cluster together while mating. It has been observed in various kinds of animals including toads, bees and wasps, and snakes such as garter snakes and anacondas. Often the ball consists of a single female and many males; a particularly asymmetrical case is that of the red-sided garter snakes which form each spring some of the most populous mating balls observed, in which as many as a hundred males try to reproduce with a single female.

== Herptiles ==
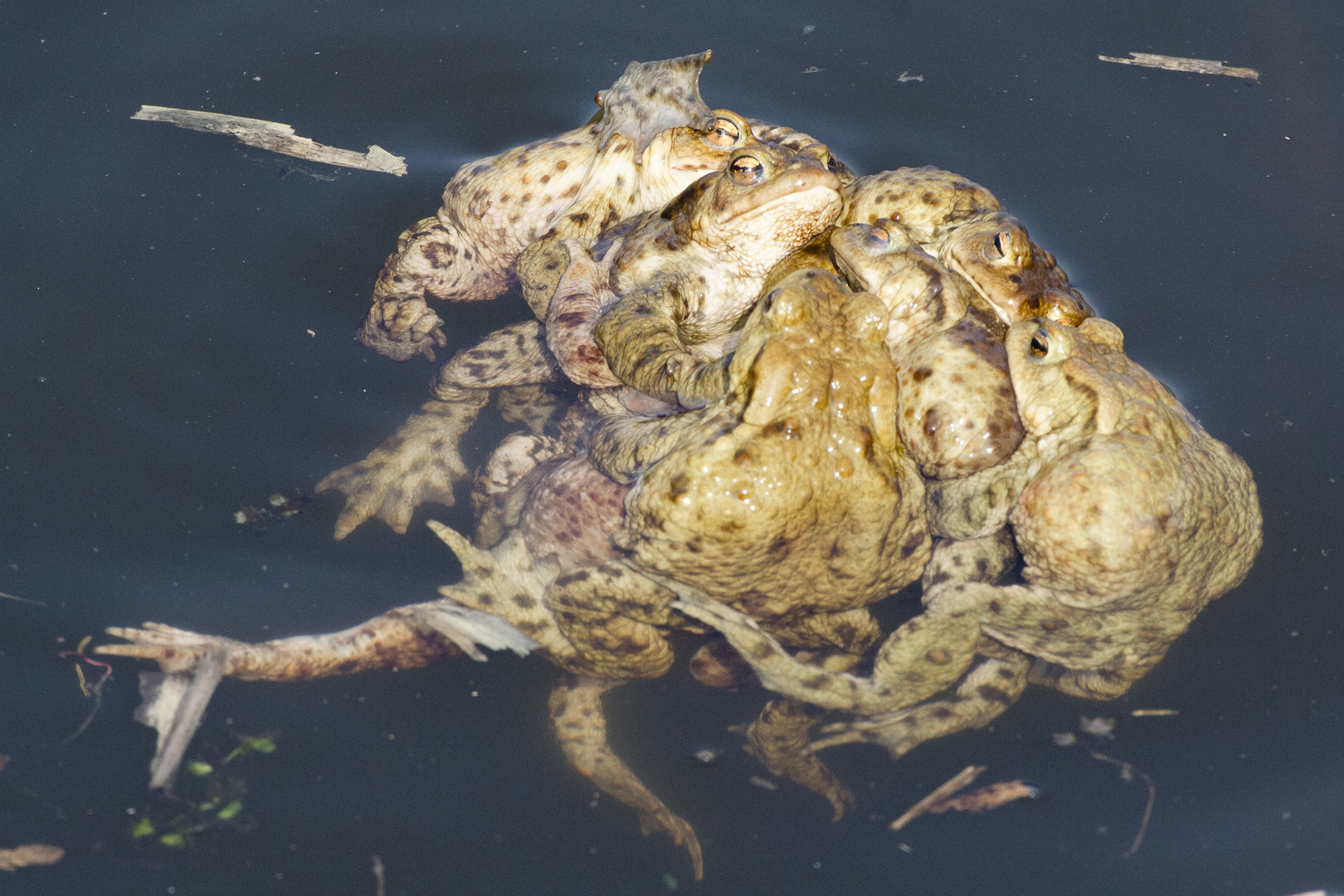
Bufo bufo

As poikilotherms, reptiles and amphibians are susceptible to sluggishness from cold weather. This causes a sexual competition among the first individuals to emerge from brumation to successfully mate before competitors are fully active. Body contact between members of the ball conserves the group's heat to enable the activity of mating to continue. Mating ball behaviour has been observed in Thamnophis species, Cubophis vudii, Natrix natrix, Bufo bufo, Bufo boreas, and other species. In the context of amphibians, mating balls are sometimes known as 'multiple amplexus'.

== Insects ==
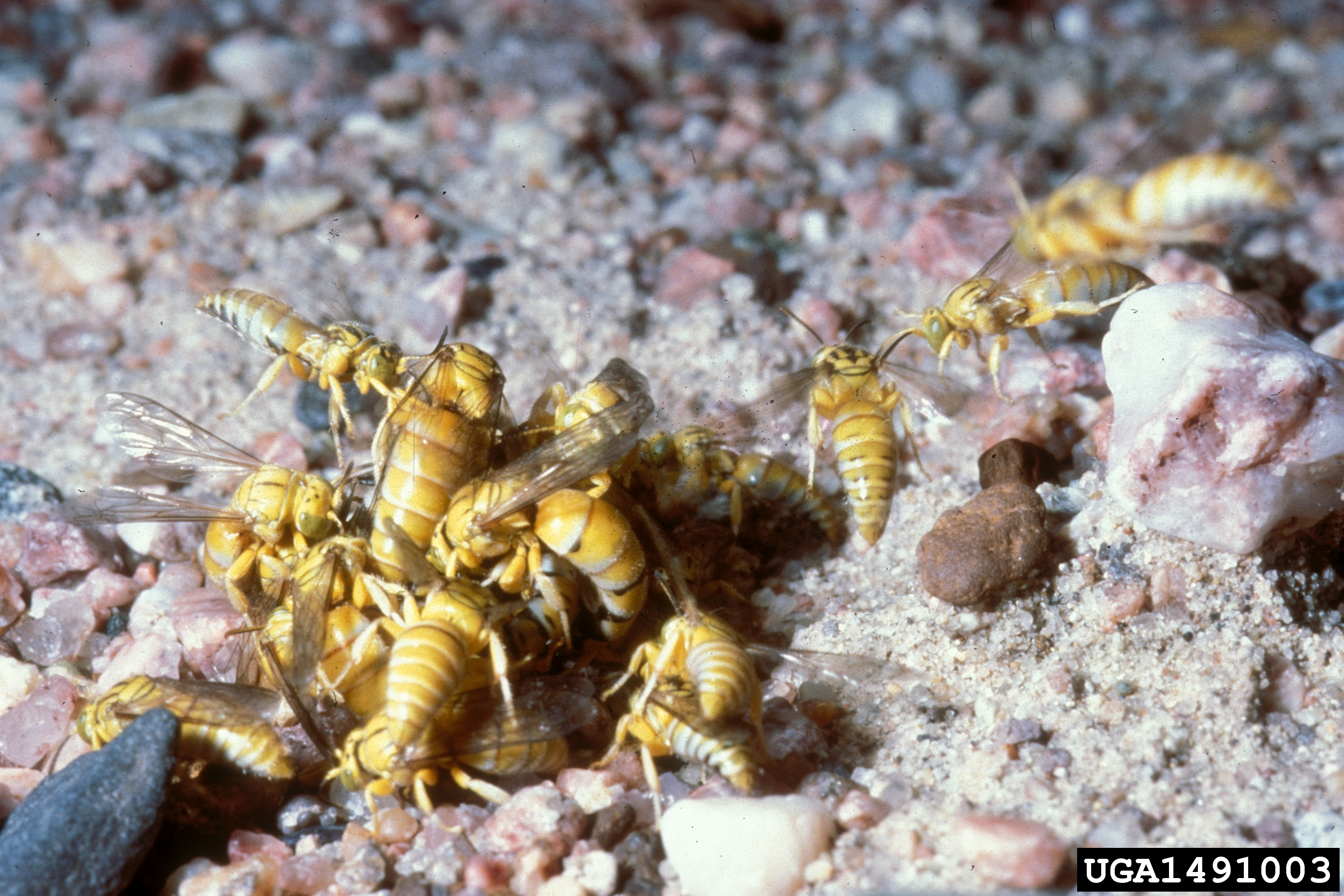
B. quinquespinosus

Kevin M. O'Neill has observed mating balls in Bembecinus quinquespinosus. Habropoda miserabilis also mate in balls. The phenomenon has been observed infrequently in stoneflies, although it is thought that it may be more common than might be inferred from observations thus far. Japanese beetles also make large mating balls, of which the occurrence in human spaces contributes to their being commonly regarded as a pest species. Once the female emerges from the ground, she releases a pheromone which attracts other beetles to form the mating ball. These balls are unusual among insects in that there may be multiple females in each one.

== See also ==
- Nuptial flight
- Group sex
- Mate choice
