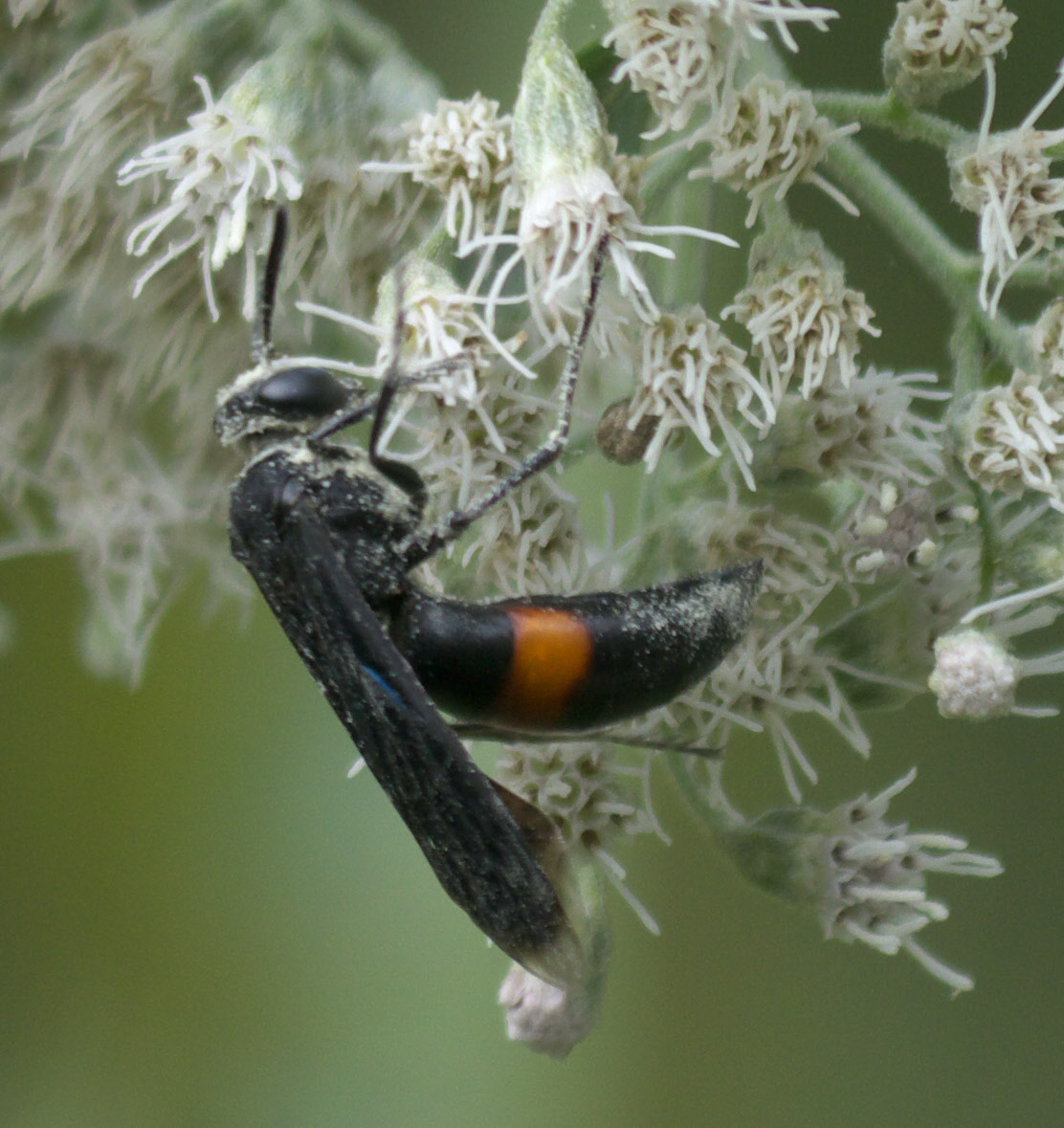

Scientific classification
- Domain: Eukaryota
- Kingdom: Animalia
- Phylum: Arthropoda
- Class: Insecta
- Order: Hymenoptera
- Family: Bembicidae
- Genus: Stizoides
- Species: S. renicinctus

Binomial name
- Stizoides renicinctus (Say, 1823)

Synonyms
- Larra unicincta Say, 1823; Stizoides unicinctus Say, 1824; Stizus renicinctus (Say, 1824); Stizus unicinctus (Say, 1824)

= Stizoides renicinctus =

Species of wasp

Stizoides renicinctus is a species of sand wasp in the family Bembicidae. It is found in Central America and North America.
