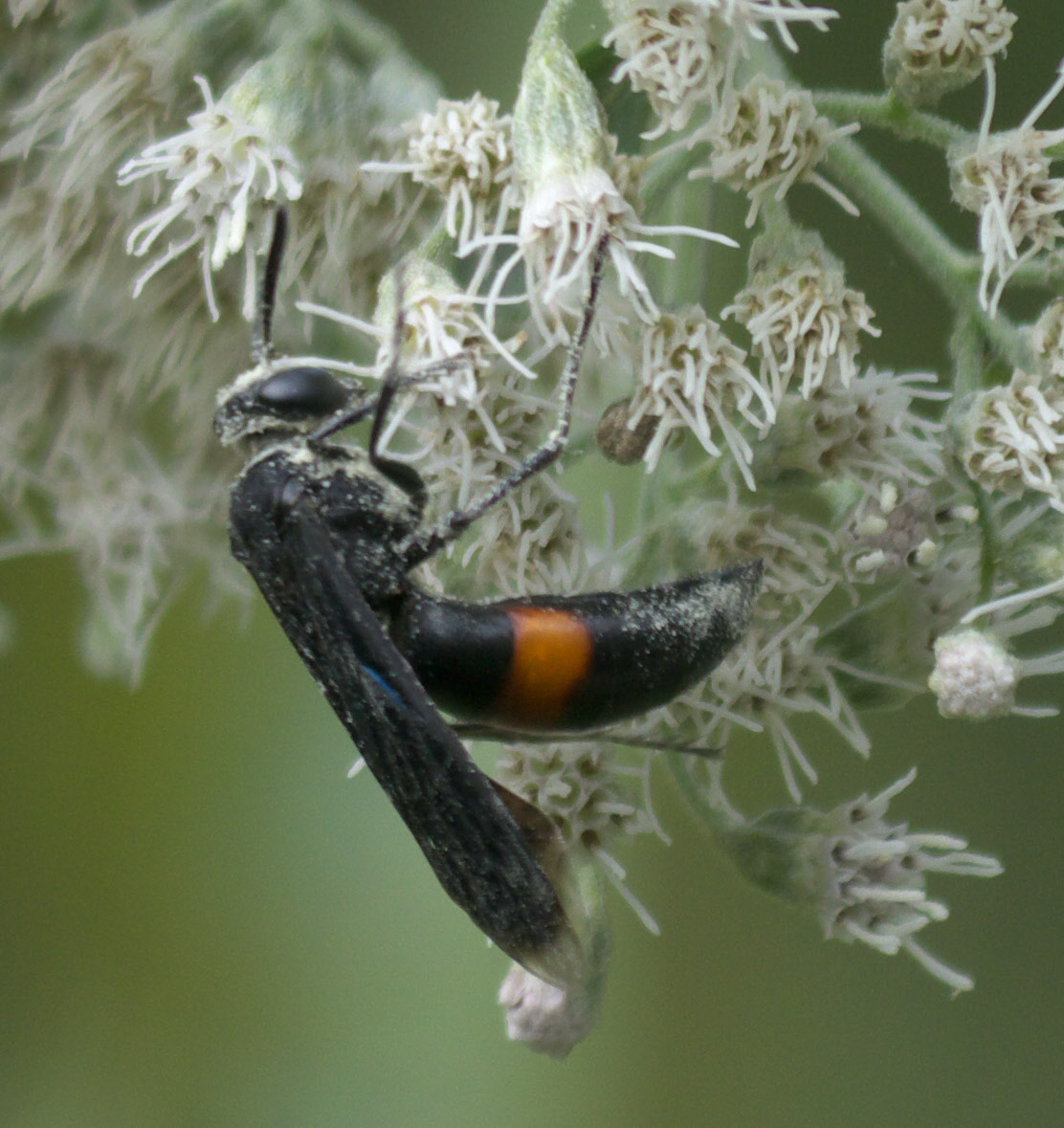
- Stizoides renicinctus

Scientific classification
- Kingdom: Animalia
- Phylum: Arthropoda
- Clade: Pancrustacea
- Class: Insecta
- Order: Hymenoptera
- Family: Bembicidae
- Subtribe: Stizina
- Genus: Stizoides; Guérin-Méneville, 1844

Synonyms
- Scotomphales Vachal, 1900; Tachystizus Pate, 1937

= Stizoides =

Genus of wasps

Stizoides is a genus of kleptoparasitic sand wasps in the family Bembicidae. There are at least 30 described species in Stizoides.

== Species ==
- Stizoides abdominalis (Dahlbom, 1845)
- Stizoides amoenus (F. Smith, 1856)
- Stizoides aryan Ohl, 1999
- Stizoides assimilis (Fabricius, 1787)
- Stizoides blandinus (F. Smith, 1856)
- Stizoides citrinus (Klug, 1845)
- Stizoides conscriptus (Nurse, 1903)
- Stizoides cornutus (F. Smith, 1873)
- Stizoides crassicornis (Fabricius, 1787)
- Stizoides cyanipennis (de Saussure, 1887)
- Stizoides cyanopterus (Gussakovskij, 1928)
- Stizoides erythrogaster (R. Turner, 1917)
- Stizoides fenestratus (F. Smith, 1856)
- Stizoides foxi Gillaspy, 1963 (Fox's stizoides)
- Stizoides funebris (Handlirsch, 1900)
- Stizoides klugii (F. Smith, 1856)
- Stizoides labirubiginus X. Zhang and Q. Li, 2011
- Stizoides melanopterus (Dahlbom, 1845)
- Stizoides mionii (Guérin-Méneville, 1844)
- Stizoides niger (Radoszkowski, 1881)
- Stizoides persimilis (R. Turner, 1918)
- Stizoides renicinctus (Say, 1823)
- Stizoides rubifunebris Ohl, 1999
- Stizoides sahel Ohl, 1999
- Stizoides simpsoni (R. Turner, 1916)
- Stizoides sokoto Ohl, 1999
- Stizoides tridentatus (Fabricius, 1775)
- Stizoides tuberculiventris (R. Turner, 1912)
- Stizoides verhoeffi Bytinski-Salz, 1955
- Stizoides zulu Ohl, 1999
