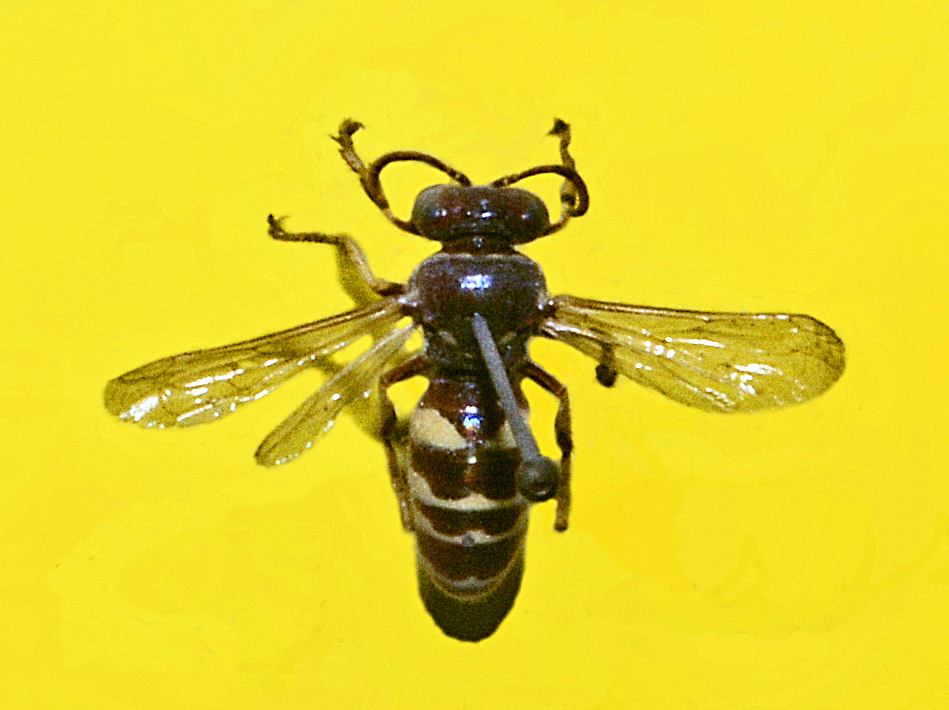
- Bembecinus tridens, Museum specimen

Scientific classification
- Domain: Eukaryota
- Kingdom: Animalia
- Phylum: Arthropoda
- Class: Insecta
- Order: Hymenoptera
- Family: Bembicidae
- Tribe: Bembicini
- Subtribe: Stizina
- Genus: Bembecinus
- Species: B. tridens

Binomial name
- Bembecinus tridens (Fabricius, 1781)

Synonyms
- Vespa tridens Fabricius, 1781; Stizus cyanescens Radoszkowski, 1887

= Bembecinus tridens =

Species of wasp

Bembecinus tridens is a species of sand wasps belonging to the family Bembicidae.

== Subspecies ==
- Bembecinus tridens caesius (Compte Sart, 1959)
- Bembecinus tridens tridens (Fabricius, 1781)

== Description ==
Bembecinus tridens can reach a length of 7–11 millimetres (0.28–0.43 in). The body is black and yellow.

== Biology ==
These wasps fly in one generation from early June to late August. The females dig a unicellular nest, though a single female digs 1-8 nests in succession. After an egg is laid in the cell the prey item (various families of Homoptera) is introduced. The species is parasitized by Hedychrum chalybaeum.

== Distribution and habitat ==
This species can be found from Western Europe and North Africa to Japan and China. They are common inhabitants of sandy areas.

== Bibliography ==
- Nemkov P. G. (2012). Digger wasps of the genus Bembecinus A. Costa, 1859 (Hymenoptera, Crabronidae, Bembicinae) of the fauna of Russia and neighbouring countries. - Bembecinus A. Costa, 1859 (Hymenoptera, Crabronidae, Bembicinae)). // Far Eastern Entomologist. 2012. N 251. C. 1–11. ISSN 1026-051X
- Rolf Witt: Wespen. Beobachten, Bestimmen. Naturbuch-Verlag, Augsburg 1998, ISBN 3-89440-243-1.
