= Stizoides foxi =

Scientific classification
- Domain: Eukaryota
- Kingdom: Animalia
- Phylum: Arthropoda
- Class: Insecta
- Order: Hymenoptera
- Family: Bembicidae
- Genus: Stizoides
- Species: S. foxi

Binomial name
- Stizoides foxi Gillaspy, 1963

Species of wasp

Stizoides foxi, or Fox's stizoide, is a species of sand wasp in the family Bembicidae. It is found in Central America and North America.
