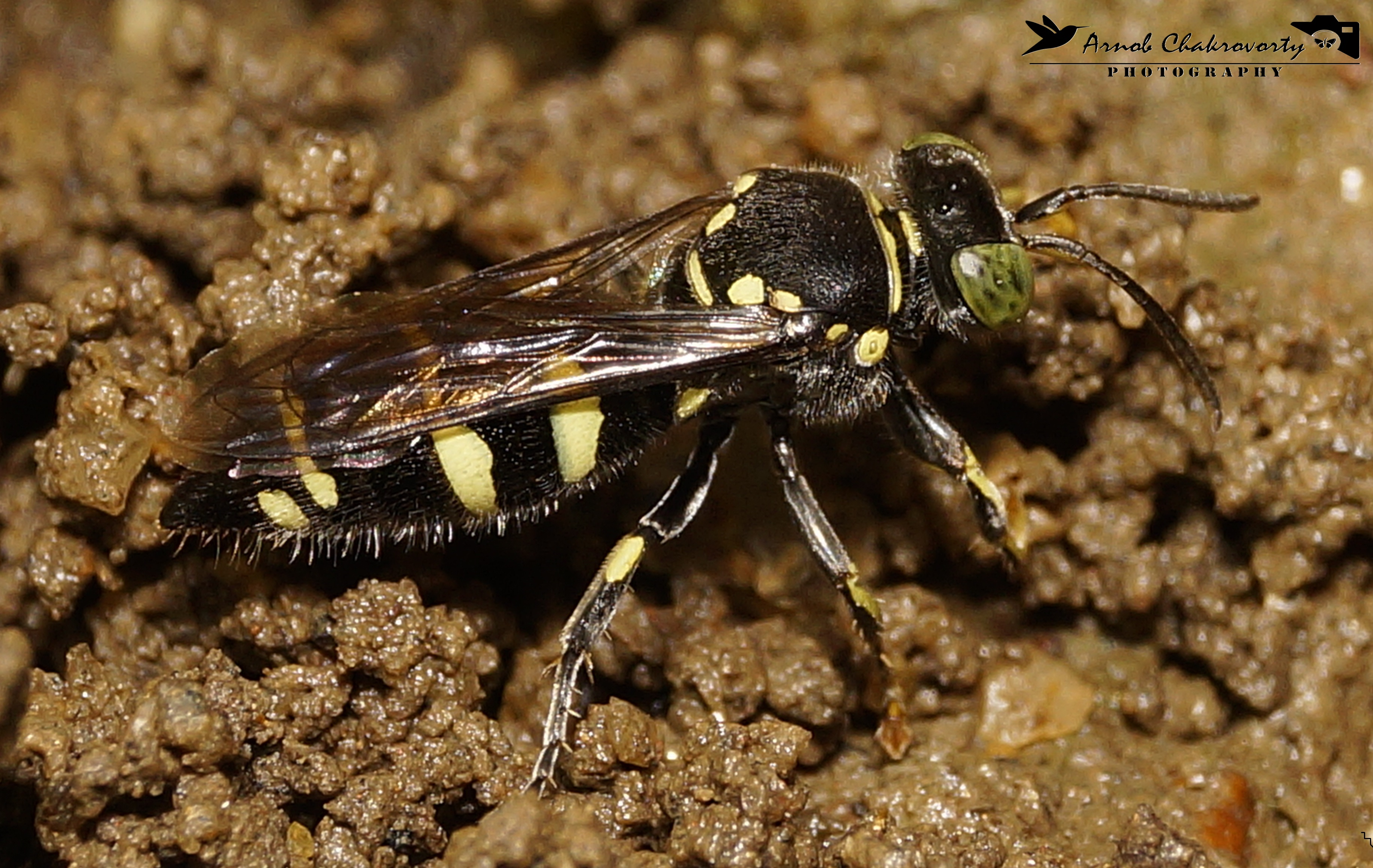
- Female

Scientific classification
- Domain: Eukaryota
- Kingdom: Animalia
- Phylum: Arthropoda
- Class: Insecta
- Order: Hymenoptera
- Family: Bembicidae
- Genus: Bembecinus
- Species: B. proximus

Binomial name
- Bembecinus proximus (Handlirsch, 1892)

= Bembecinus proximus =

Species of wasp

Bembecinus proximus is a sand wasp species which was described by Anton Handlirsch in 1892 which is known to be distributed in Saudi Arabia, Pakistan, Nepal, Sri Lanka and India.

== Ecology and natural history. ==
This species is known to actively predate on a vast range of homopteran insects which includes families like Cicadellidae, Cixiidae, Delphacidae, Flatidae, Fulgoridae and others. The species has been observed to prefer nectar from the flowers of Ziziphus mauritiana.

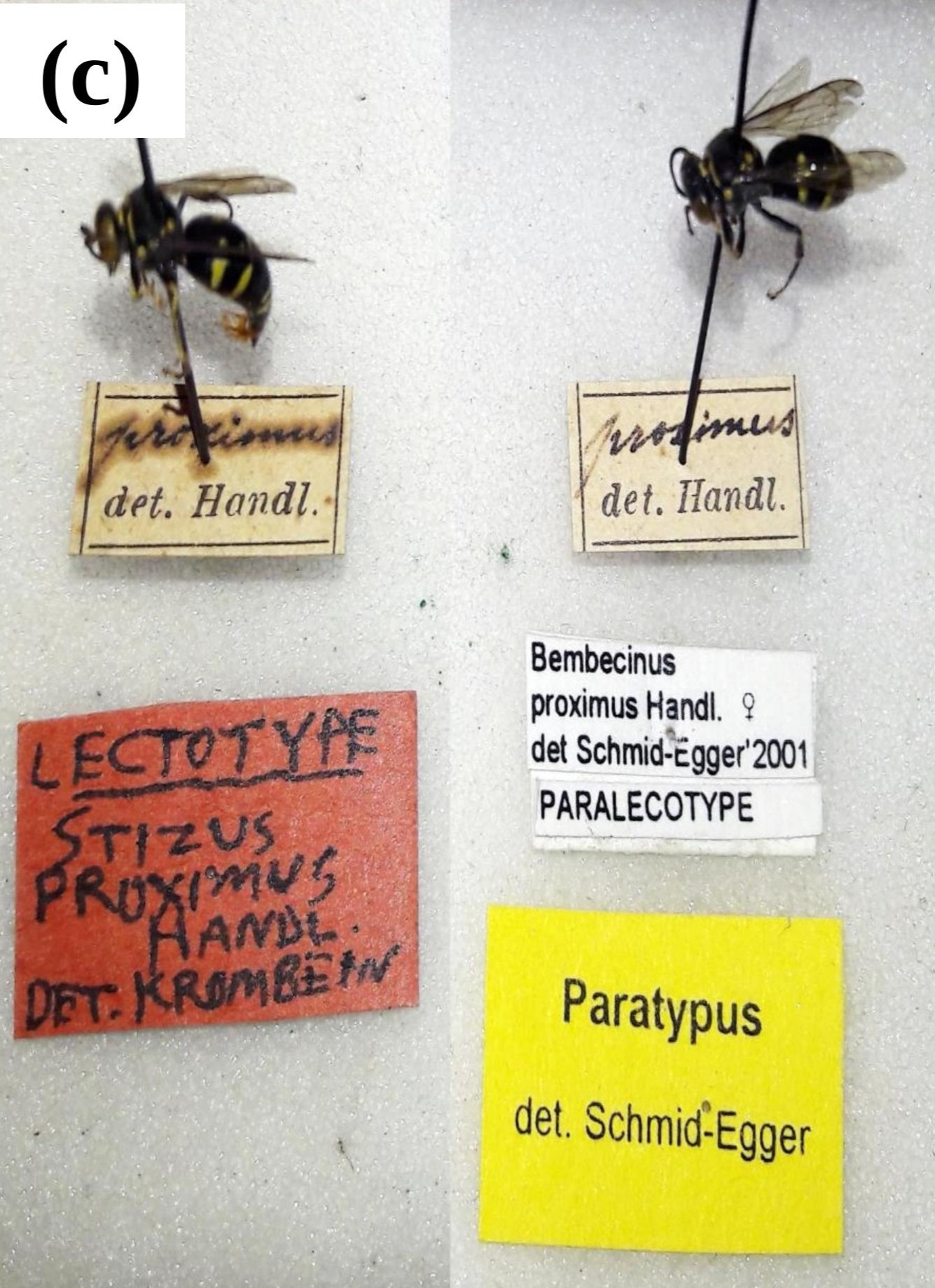
Lectotype and the paralectotype of Bembecinus proximus
