= Bembecinus neglectus =

Scientific classification
- Domain: Eukaryota
- Kingdom: Animalia
- Phylum: Arthropoda
- Class: Insecta
- Order: Hymenoptera
- Family: Bembicidae
- Genus: Bembecinus
- Species: B. neglectus

Binomial name
- Bembecinus neglectus (Cresson, 1873)

Synonyms
- Monedula neglecta Cresson, 1873; Stizus xanthochrous Handlirsch, 1892

Species of wasp

Bembecinus neglectus is a species of sand wasp in the family Bembicidae. It is found in North America.
