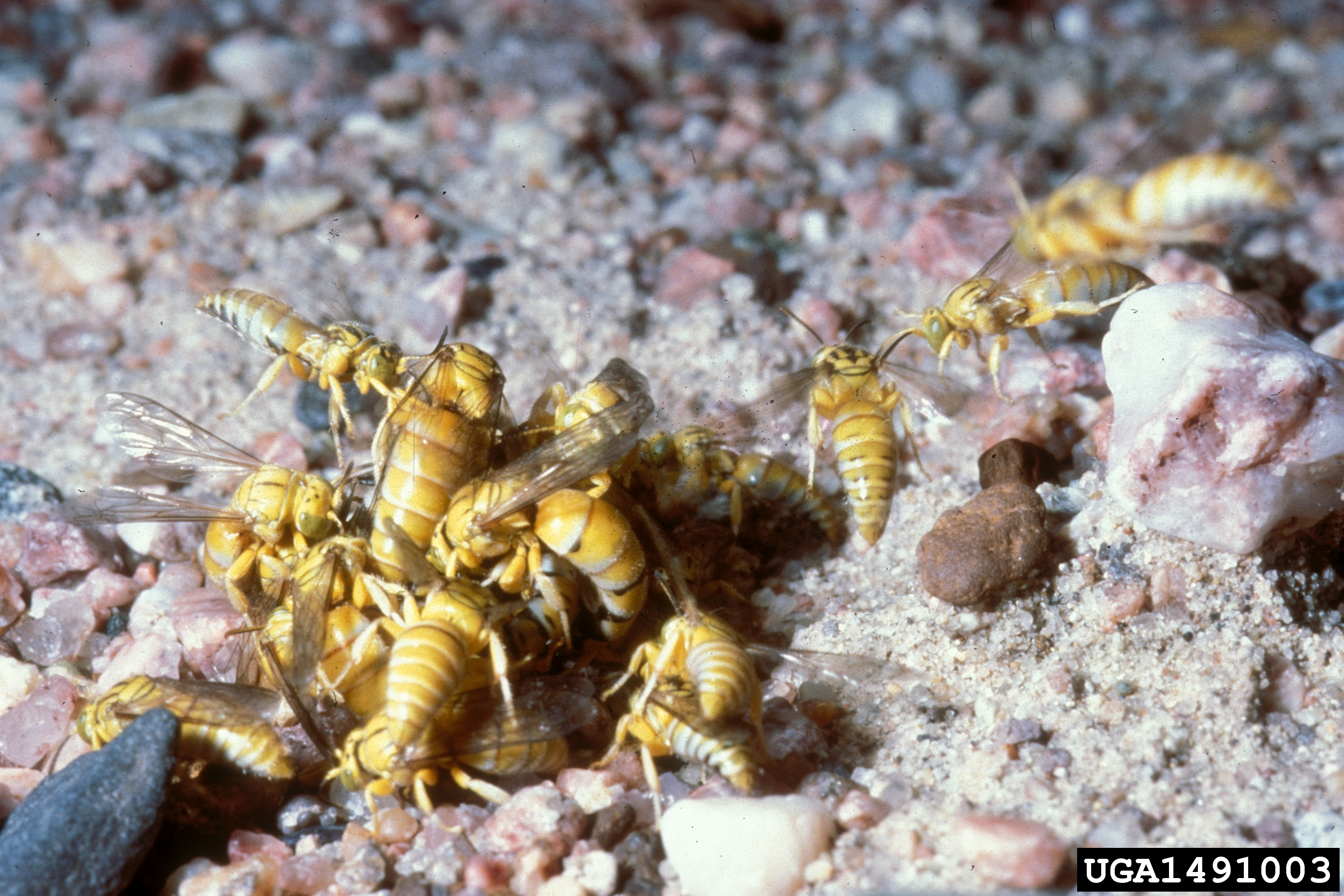

Scientific classification
- Domain: Eukaryota
- Kingdom: Animalia
- Phylum: Arthropoda
- Class: Insecta
- Order: Hymenoptera
- Family: Bembicidae
- Genus: Bembecinus
- Species: B. quinquespinosus

Binomial name
- Bembecinus quinquespinosus (Say, 1823)

Synonyms
- Bembecinus arechavaletai (Brèthes, 1909); Bembecinus bolivari (Handlirsch, 1892); Bembecinus excisus (Handlirsch, 1892); Bembecinus godmani (Cameron, 1890); Bembecinus godmani bolivari (Handlirsch, 1892); Bembecinus nectarinioides (Ducke, 1910); Bembecinus spegazzinii (Brèthes, 1909); Larra dubia F. Smith, 1856; Larra spegazzinii (Brèthes, 1909); Nysson cressoni Cameron, 1904; Nysson quinquespinosus Say, 1823; Stizus arechavaletai Brèthes, 1909; Stizus bolivari Handlirsch, 1892; Stizus dubius (F. Smith, 1856); Stizus excisus Handlirsch, 1892; Stizus flavus Cameron, 1890; Stizus flavus subalpinus Cockerell, 1899; Stizus godmani Cameron, 1890; Stizus godmani flavus Cameron, 1890; Stizus godmani lineatus Cameron, 1890; Stizus lineatus Cameron, 1890; Stizus nectarinioides Ducke, 1910; Stizus spegazzinii Brèthes, 1909; Stizus subalpinus Cockerell, 1899

= Bembecinus quinquespinosus =

Species of wasp

Bembecinus quinquespinosus is a species of sand wasp in the family Bembicidae. It is found in the Caribbean Sea, Central America, North America, and South America.
