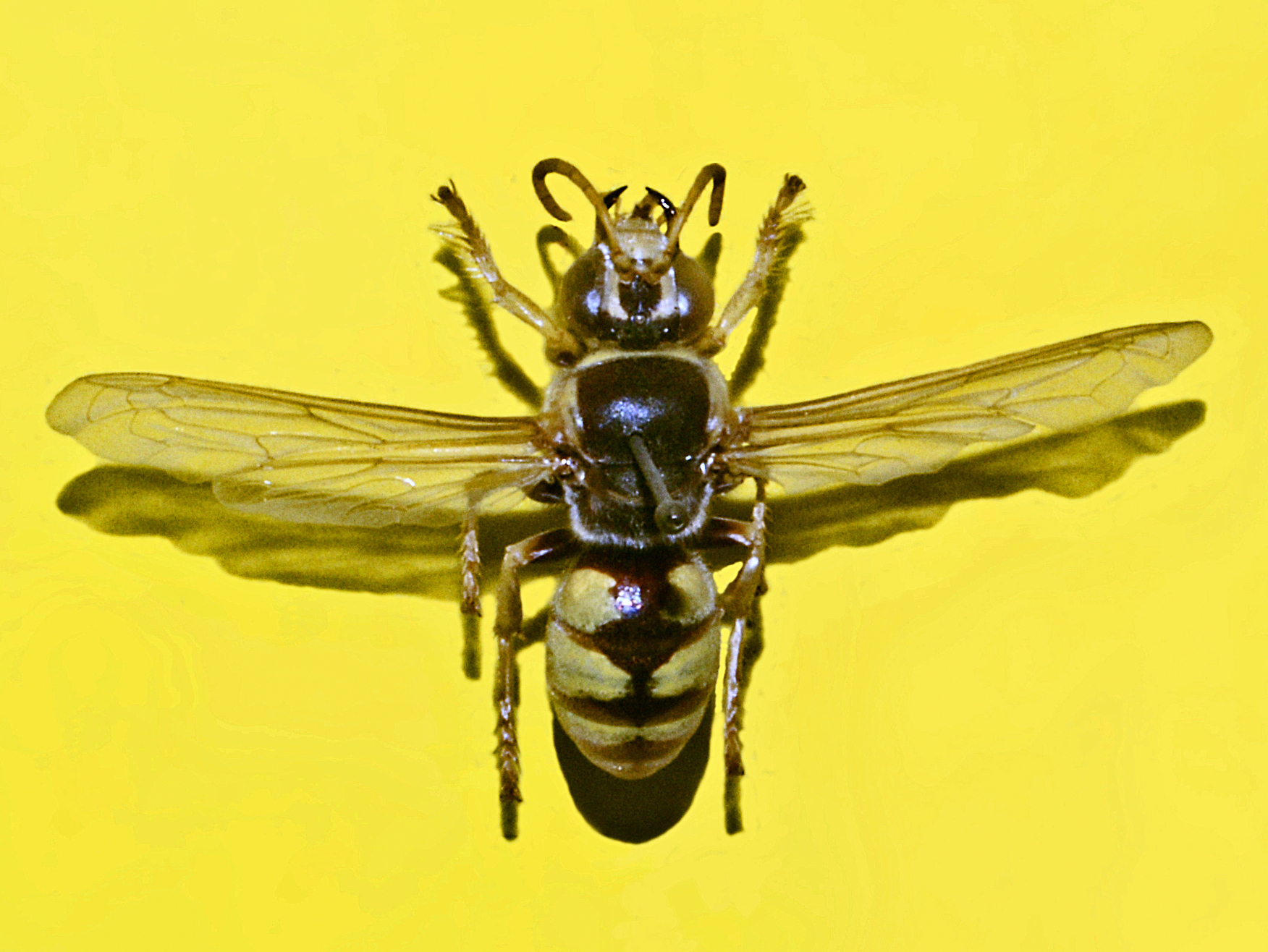
- Stizus fasciatus, Museum specimen

Scientific classification
- Kingdom: Animalia
- Phylum: Arthropoda
- Class: Insecta
- Order: Hymenoptera
- Family: Bembicidae
- Genus: Stizus
- Species: S. fasciatus

Binomial name
- Stizus fasciatus (Fabricius, 1781)

= Stizus fasciatus =

Species of wasp

Stizus fasciatus is a species of sand wasps belonging to the family Bembicidae.

== Description ==
Stizus fasciatus can reach a length of 16–24 millimetres (0.63–0.94 in). Head and thorax are black, while the abdomen shows yellow and black bands. Wings are darkened.

== Biology ==
Adults can be found in June and August. Females build a nest with several cells in the sandy soil. Then they lay eggs on the body of paralyzed grasshoppers.

== Distribution and habitat ==
This species can be found in most of southern Europe, in North Africa and in the Near East up to China (Russia, France, Spain, Italy, Croatia, Montenegro, Serbia, Greece, Romania, Bulgaria, Cyprus, Ukraine, Turkey, Israel, Kazakhstan, Uzbekistan, Turkmenistan, Tajikistan, Iran, Mongolia, China, Morocco, Algeria, Egypt). These wasps prefers xerophytic areas.
