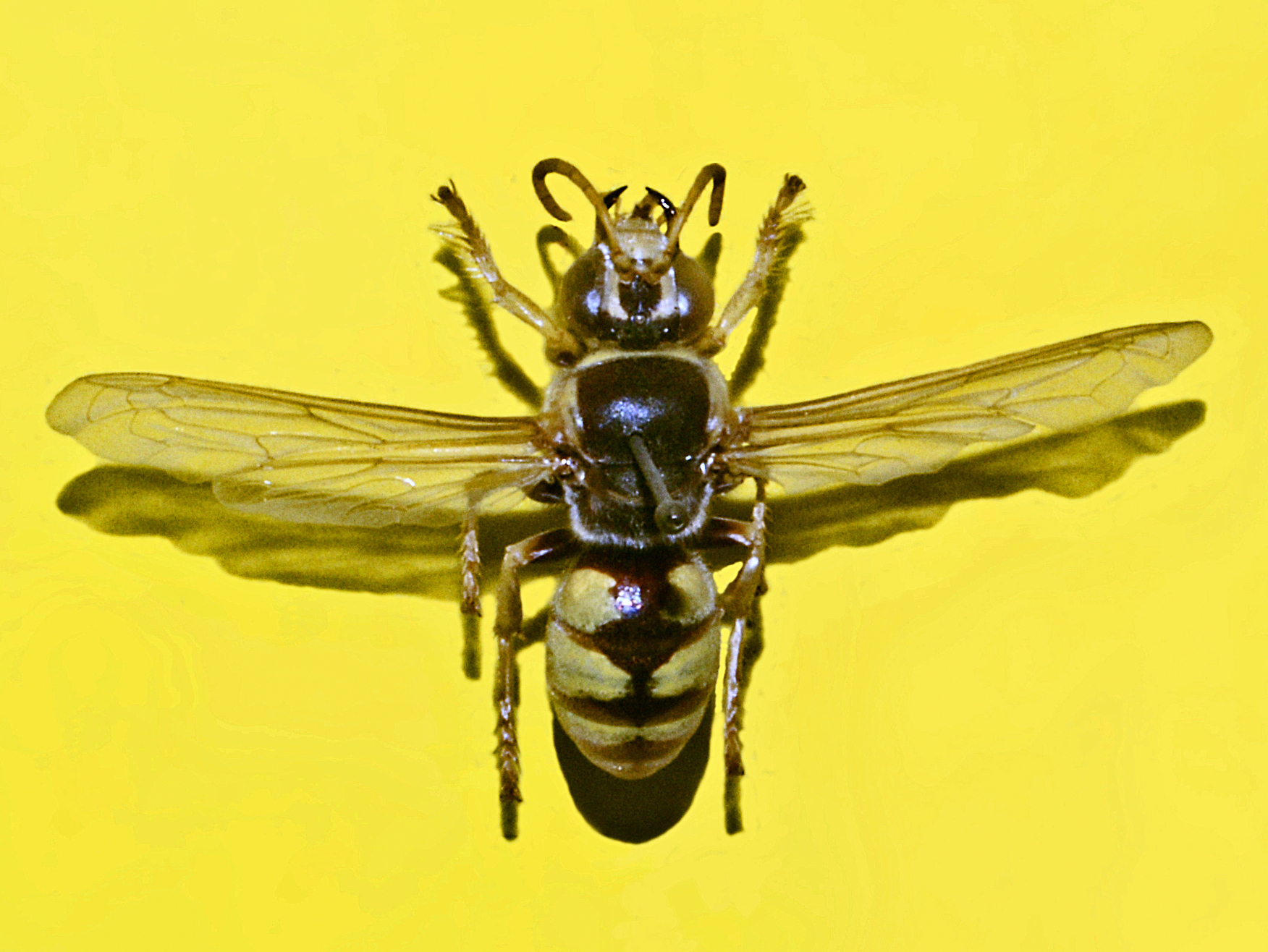
- Stizus fasciatus

Scientific classification
- Kingdom: Animalia
- Phylum: Arthropoda
- Class: Insecta
- Order: Hymenoptera
- Family: Bembicidae
- Tribe: Bembicini
- Subtribe: Stizina
- Genus: Stizus; Latreille, 1802

Type species
- Stizus ruficornis (Forster, 1771)

= Stizus =

Genus of wasps

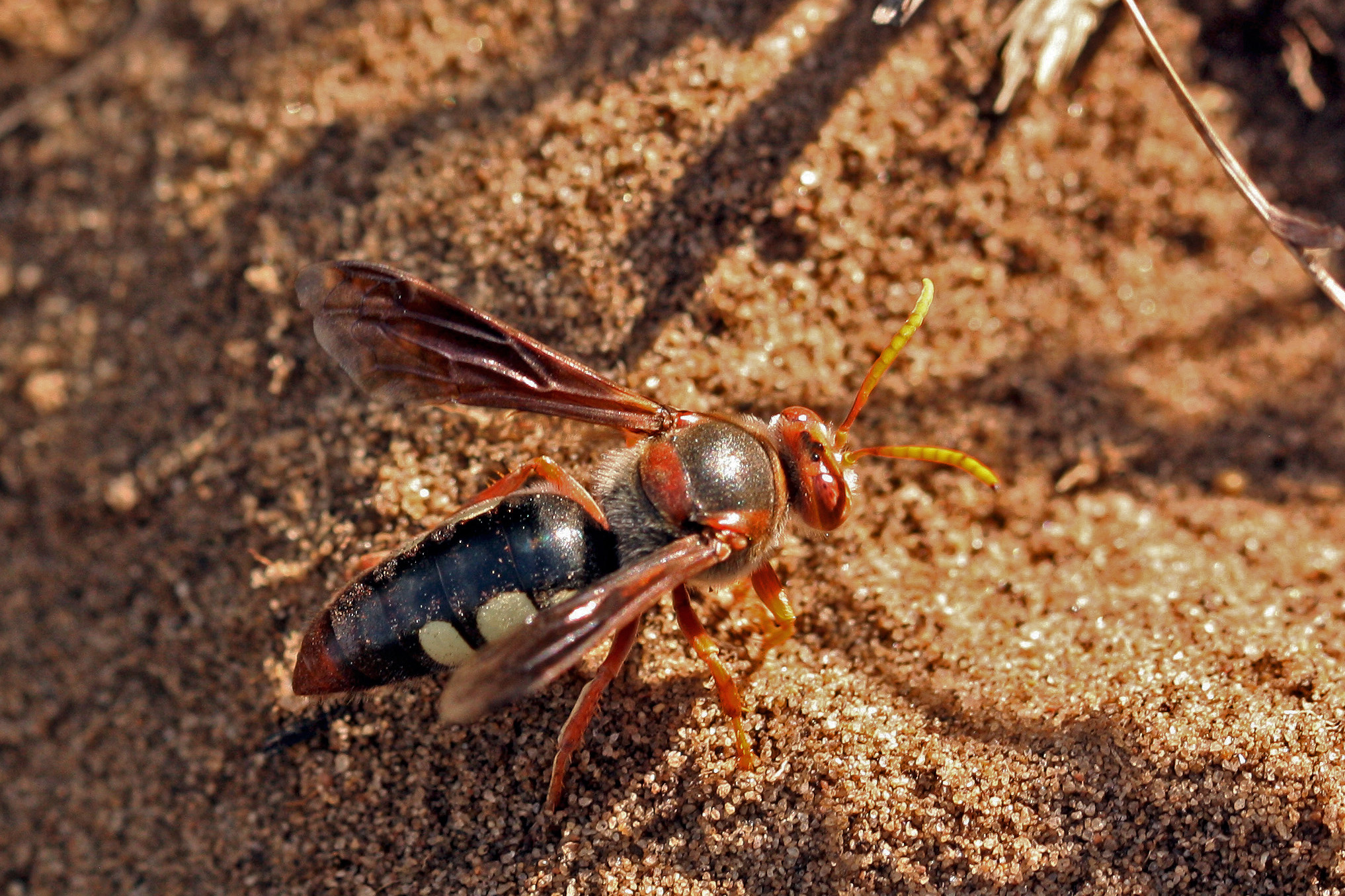
S. fuscipennis Kwa-Zulu Natal, South Africa

Stizus is a genus of sand wasps belonging to the family Bembicidae. There are over 100 species.

These wasps can reach a length of about 34 millimetres (1.3 in). They are yellow and black, rarely reddish. Species within this genus can be found in Europe, in Africa, and in North America.

== European species ==
Species within this genus include:

- Stizus aestivalis Mercet, 1906
- Stizus annulatus (Klug, 1845)
- Stizus bipunctatus (Smith, 1856)
- Stizus continuus (Klug, 1835)
- Stizus fasciatus (Fabricius, 1781)
- Stizus hispanicus Mocsary, 1883
- Stizus perrisi DuFour, 1838
- Stizus pubescens (Klug, 1835)
- Stizus ruficornis (Forster, 1771)
- Stizus rufipes (Fabricius, 1804)
- Stizus tricolor Handlirsch, 1892

== See also ==
- List of Stizus species
