= Stizina =

Scientific classification
- Kingdom: Animalia
- Phylum: Arthropoda
- Class: Insecta
- Order: Hymenoptera
- Family: Bembicidae
- Subfamily: Bembicinae
- Tribe: Bembicini
- Subtribe: Stizina

Genera
- Bembecinus; Stizoides; Stizus

Tribe of wasps

The Stizina is a subtribe of small to large-sized sand wasps in the tribe Bembicini. The subtribe is distinguished primarily by features of wing venation. Members of the genus Stizus are large, and superficially resemble cicada-killer wasps (genus Sphecius, in the related subtribe Spheciina), and members of the genus Stizoides are cleptoparasites in the nests of other crabronids.
