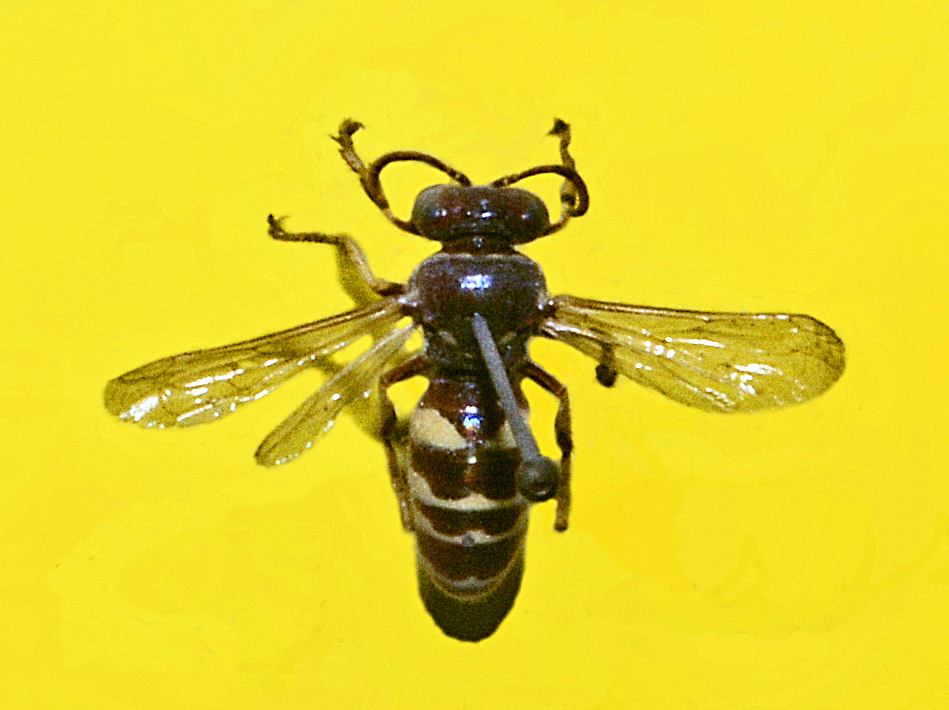
- Bembecinus tridens

Scientific classification
- Domain: Eukaryota
- Kingdom: Animalia
- Phylum: Arthropoda
- Class: Insecta
- Order: Hymenoptera
- Family: Bembicidae
- Subtribe: Stizina
- Genus: Bembecinus; Costa, 1859

Type species
- Bembecinus meridionalis Costa 1859

Diversity
- at least 200 species

Synonyms
- Gorystizus A. Costa, 1859; Stizomorphus Pate, 1937

= Bembecinus =

Genus of wasps

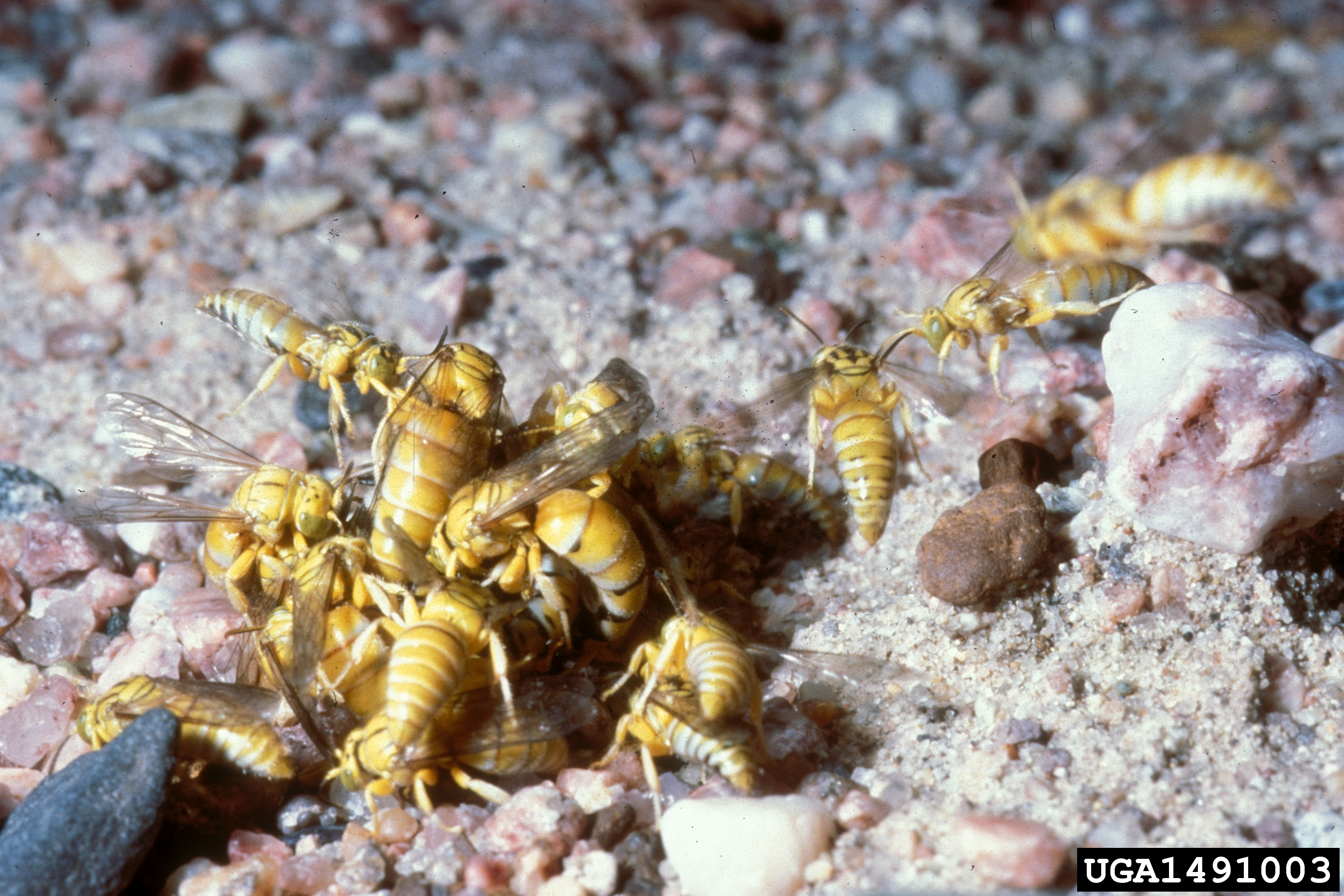
Bembecinus quinquespinosus

Bembecinus is a cosmopolitan genus of sand wasps belonging to the family Bembicidae. There are at least 200 described species in Bembecinus.

== European species ==
- Bembecinus carinatus Lohrman 1942
- Bembecinus carpetanus (Mercet 1906)
- Bembecinus crassipes (Handlirsch 1895)
- Bembecinus cyprius Beaumont 1954
- Bembecinus hungaricus (Frivaldszky 1876)
- Bembecinus insulanus Beaumont 1954
- Bembecinus meridionalis A. Costa 1859
- Bembecinus peregrinus (F. Smith 1856)
- Bembecinus pulchellus (Mercet 1906)
- Bembecinus tridens (Fabricius 1781)

== See also ==
- List of Bembecinus species
