= List of Hybomitra species =

This is a list of species in the genus Hybomitra.

== Hybomitra species ==
- Hybomitra aasa Philip, 1954
- Hybomitra aatos Philip, 1941
- Hybomitra abaensis Xu & Song, 1983
- Hybomitra acuminata (Loew, 1858)
- Hybomitra aequetincta (Becker, 1900)
- Hybomitra afasciata Wang, 1989
- Hybomitra affinis (Kirby, 1837)
- Hybomitra agnitionalis (Austen, 1922)
- Hybomitra agora Teskey, 1987
- Hybomitra akiyamai Murdoch & Takahasi, 1969
- Hybomitra aksuensis Wang, 1985
- Hybomitra alegrei Dias, 1984
- Hybomitra altaica (Olsufiev, 1936)
- Hybomitra alticola Wang, 1981
- Hybomitra ampulla Wang & Liu, 1990
- Hybomitra angolensis (Dias, 1964)
- Hybomitra arpadi (Szilády, 1923)
- Hybomitra astur (Erichson, 1851)
- Hybomitra asturoides Liu & Wang, 1977
- Hybomitra astuta (Osten Sacken, 1876)
- Hybomitra aterrima (Meigen, 1820)
- Hybomitra atripalpis Wang, 1992
- Hybomitra atrobasis (McDunnough, 1921)
- Hybomitra aurilimba (Stone, 1938)
- Hybomitra auripila (Meigen, 1820)
- Hybomitra baphoscota Xu & Liu, 1985
- Hybomitra barkamensis Wang, 1981
- Hybomitra bhutanensis Datta, 1979
- Hybomitra bimaculata (Macquart, 1826) - hairy-legged horsefly
- Hybomitra borealis (Fabricius, 1779)
- Hybomitra bouvieri Philip, 1979
- Hybomitra branta Wang, 1982
- Hybomitra brantoides Wang, 1984
- Hybomitra brennani (Stone, 1938)
- Hybomitra brevis (Loew, 1858)
- Hybomitra bulongicauda Liu & Xu, 1990
- Hybomitra burgeri Kapoor, Grewal & Sharma, 1991
- Hybomitra californica (Marten, 1882)
- Hybomitra caparti Leclercq, 1967
- Hybomitra captonis (Marten, 1882)
- Hybomitra castaneocallosa Olsufiev, 1967
- Hybomitra caucasi (Szilády, 1923)
- Hybomitra caucasica (Enderlein, 1925)
- Hybomitra chevalieri (Surcouf, 1906)
- Hybomitra chvalai Xu & Zhang, 1990
- Hybomitra cincta (Fabricius, 1794)
- Hybomitra coheri Xu & Zhang, 1990
- Hybomitra ciureai (Séguy, 1937) - Levels yellow-horned horsefly
- Hybomitra confiformis Chvála & Moucha, 1971
- Hybomitra criddlei (Brooks, 1946)
- Hybomitra cuspidata (Austen, 1924)
- Hybomitra cyanops (Brauer, 1880)
- Hybomitra daeckei (Hine, 1917)
- Hybomitra decora (Loew, 1858)
- Hybomitra difficilis (Wiedemann, 1828)
- Hybomitra distinguenda (Verrall, 1909) - bright horsefly
- Hybomitra eberi (Brauer, 1880)
- Hybomitra echusa Wang, 1982
- Hybomitra enigmatica Teskey, 1982
- Hybomitra epistates (Osten Sacken, 1878)
- Hybomitra expollicata (Pandellé, 1883) - striped horsefly
- Hybomitra fattigi Philip, 1966
- Hybomitra flavicoma Wang, 1981
- Hybomitra formosovi Olsufiev, 1967
- Hybomitra frenchii (Marten, 1883)
- Hybomitra frontalis (Walker, 1848)
- Hybomitra frosti Pechuman, 1960
- Hybomitra fulvilateralis (Macquart, 1838)
- Hybomitra fulvotaenia Wang, 1982
- Hybomitra fuscomaculata Wang, 1985
- Hybomitra gramina Xu, 1983
- Hybomitra graminoida Xu, 1983
- Hybomitra haidongensis Xu & Jin, 1990
- Hybomitra harai Hayakawa & Takahasi, 1976
- Hybomitra hearlei (Philip, 1936)
- Hybomitra himalayana (Enderlein, 1925)
- Hybomitra hinei (Johnson, 1904)
- Hybomitra hirta (Walker, 1850)
- Hybomitra holonigera Xu & Li, 1982
- Hybomitra hsiaohei Wang, 1982
- Hybomitra hunnorum (Szilády, 1923)
- Hybomitra illota (Osten Sacken, 1876)
- Hybomitra ishiharai (Takahasi, 1950)
- Hybomitra itasca (Philip, 1936)
- Hybomitra jersey (Takahasi, 1950)
- Hybomitra kalatopensis Kapoor, Grewal & Sharma, 1991
- Hybomitra kansuensis Olsufiev, 1967
- Hybomitra kashgarica Olsufiev, 1970
- Hybomitra kasongoensis (Benoit, 1964)
- Hybomitra kaurii Chvála & Lyneborg, 1970
- Hybomitra kavumuensis Fain & Elsen, 1981
- Hybomitra khazziarensis Kapoor, Grewal & Sharma, 1991
- Hybomitra koidzumii Murdoch & Takahasi, 1969
- Hybomitra kourii (Dias, 1974)
- Hybomitra kozlovi Olsufiev, 1967
- Hybomitra kuehlhorni Leclercq, 1967
- Hybomitra ladongensis Liu & Yao, 1981
- Hybomitra lamades Philip, 1961
- Hybomitra lanifera (McDunnough, 1922)
- Hybomitra lasiophthalma (Macquart, 1838)
- Hybomitra lhasaensis Wang, 1982
- Hybomitra liorhina (Philip, 1936)
- Hybomitra litoralis Yonetsu, Shinogi & Watanabe, 2018
- Hybomitra liui Yang & Xu, 1993
- Hybomitra liupanshanensis Liu, Wang & Xu, 1990
- Hybomitra longicorna Wang, 1984
- Hybomitra longiglossa (Philip, 1931)
- Hybomitra longipalpis (Kröber, 1923)
- Hybomitra longziensis Xu, 1995
- Hybomitra lundbecki Lyneborg, 1959
- Hybomitra lurida (Fallén, 1817) - broad-headed horsefly
- Hybomitra lyneborgi Chvála, 1969
- Hybomitra macularis (Fabricius, 1794)
- Hybomitra magimeli (Dias, 1960)
- Hybomitra mai (Liu, 1959)
- Hybomitra mailloti (Ovazza & Taufflieb, 1959)
- Hybomitra marginialba Liu & Yao, 1981
- Hybomitra medeirosi Dias, 1989
- Hybomitra media (Kröber, 1928)
- Hybomitra melanorhina (Bigot, 1892)
- Hybomitra mendesi Dias, 1989
- Hybomitra mendica (Villeneuve, 1912)
- Hybomitra micans (Meigen, 1804)
- Hybomitra microcephala (Osten Sacken, 1876)
- Hybomitra mima Philip, 1954
- Hybomitra mimapis Wang, 1981
- Hybomitra minshanensis Xu & Liu, 1985
- Hybomitra minuscula (Hine, 1907)
- Hybomitra montana (Meigen, 1820) - slender-horned horsefly
- Hybomitra morgani (Surcouf, 1912)
- Hybomitra mouchai Chvála, 1969
- Hybomitra muehlfeldi (Brauer, 1880) - broadland horsefly
- Hybomitra muluba (Bequaert, 1913)
- Hybomitra nigella (Szilády, 1914)
- Hybomitra nigricans (Wiedemann, 1828)
- Hybomitra nigricornis (Zetterstedt, 1842)
- Hybomitra nigricorpus (Kröber, 1923)
- Hybomitra nitelofaciata Xu, 1985
- Hybomitra nitidifrons (Szilády, 1914)
- Hybomitra nola Philip, 1961
- Hybomitra nura Philip, 1961
- Hybomitra nyingchiensis Zhang & Xu, 1993
- Hybomitra obscurinervis (Violovich, 1956)
- Hybomitra ochroterma Xu & Liu, 1985
- Hybomitra okayi Leclercq, 1967
- Hybomitra olsufjeviana (Moucha & Chvála, 1959)
- Hybomitra omeishanensis Xu & Li, 1982
- Hybomitra opaca (Coquillett, 1904)
- Hybomitra osburni (Hine, 1904)
- Hybomitra paulisseni Leclercq, 1967
- Hybomitra pavlovskii (Olsufiev, 1936)
- Hybomitra pechumani Teskey & Thomas, 1979
- Hybomitra peculiaris (Szilády, 1914)
- Hybomitra pediontis (McAlpine, 1961)
- Hybomitra phaenops (Osten Sacken, 1877)
- Hybomitra pilosa (Loew, 1858)
- Hybomitra polaris (Frey, 1915)
- Hybomitra popovi (Olsufiev, 1937)
- Hybomitra porgae (Quélennec, 1963)
- Hybomitra portucalensis Dias, 1985
- Hybomitra potanini Olsufiev, 1967
- Hybomitra procyon (Osten Sacken, 1877)
- Hybomitra przewalskii Olsufiev, 1967
- Hybomitra pulchriventris (Portschinsky, 1887)
- Hybomitra qiliangensis Liu & Yao, 1981
- Hybomitra qinghaiensis Liu & Yao, 1981
- Hybomitra quelenneci Raymond & Taufflieb, 1976
- Hybomitra rara (Ricardo, 1911)
- Hybomitra reinigiana (Enderlein, 1934)
- Hybomitra rhombica (Osten Sacken, 1876)
- Hybomitra rickenbachi Raymond & Taufflieb, 1976
- Hybomitra robiginosa Wang, 1982
- Hybomitra rotundabdominis Wang, 1982
- Hybomitra rubrilata (Philip, 1937)
- Hybomitra rupestris (McDunnough, 1921)
- Hybomitra sachalinesis (Matsumura, 1911)
- Hybomitra sareptana (Szilády, 1914)
- Hybomitra seguyi Trojan, 1990
- Hybomitra semipollinosa (Olsufiev, 1937)
- Hybomitra sequax (Williston, 1887)
- Hybomitra severini (Surcouf, 1907)
- Hybomitra sexfasciata (Hine, 1923)
- Hybomitra shanghaiensis (Ôuchi, 1943)
- Hybomitra shevtshenkoi (Olsufiev, 1952)
- Hybomitra shirakii (Enderlein, 1925)
- Hybomitra shnitnikovi (Olsufiev, 1937)
- Hybomitra sodalis (Williston, 1887)
- Hybomitra sogdiana (Olsufiev, 1952)
- Hybomitra solstitialis (Meigen, 1820) - scarce forest horsefly
- Hybomitra sonomensis (Osten Sacken, 1877)
- Hybomitra sousadiasi (Dias, 1958)
- Hybomitra stenopselapha (Olsufiev, 1937)
- Hybomitra stigmoptera (Olsufiev, 1937)
- Hybomitra subcallosa (Ricardo, 1911)
- Hybomitra subfasciata (Becker, 1922)
- Hybomitra subvittata (Séguy, 1934)
- Hybomitra susurra (Marten, 1883)
- Hybomitra svenhedini (Kröber, 1933)
- Hybomitra szechwanensis Olsufiev, 1967
- Hybomitra taibaishanensis Xu, 1985
- Hybomitra takahasii Inaoka & Hayakawa, 1982
- Hybomitra tamujosoi Schacht & Portillo, 1982
- Hybomitra tanatmisi Altunsoy, 2018
- Hybomitra tarandina (Linnaeus, 1758)
- Hybomitra tarandinoides (Olsufiev, 1936)
- Hybomitra tardigrada Xu & Liu, 1985
- Hybomitra tatarica (Portschinsky, 1887)
- Hybomitra tetrica (Marten, 1883)
- Hybomitra tibetana (Szilády, 1926)
- Hybomitra trepida (McDunnough, 1921)
- Hybomitra trispila (Wiedemann, 1828)
- Hybomitra tropica (Linnaeus, 1758)
- Hybomitra tschuensis (Olsufiev, 1962)
- Hybomitra tsingvang (Szilády, 1926)
- Hybomitra tsuchimaensis Hayakawa, Yoneyama & Inaoka, 1980
- Hybomitra tsushimaensis Hayakawa, Yoneyama & Inaoka, 1980
- Hybomitra tuerkmendagensis Kiliç & Schacht, 1995
- Hybomitra turanica (Olsufiev, 1937)
- Hybomitra turkestana (Szilády, 1923)
- Hybomitra typha (Whitney, 1904)
- Hybomitra ukrainica (Olsufiev, 1952)
- Hybomitra ussuriensis (Olsufiev, 1937)
- Hybomitra valenciae (Leclercq, 1957)
- Hybomitra vexans (Loew, 1858)
- Hybomitra vicina (Macquart, 1838)
- Hybomitra vittata (Fabricius, 1794)
- Hybomitra vulpes (Szilády, 1923)
- Hybomitra vuvang (Szilády, 1926)
- Hybomitra wyvillei (Ricardo, 1911)
- Hybomitra yajianensis Zhang & Xu, 1993
- Hybomitra yaojiani Sun & Xu, 1993
- Hybomitra yaojiani Sun & Xu, 2007
- Hybomitra yaoshanensis Yang & Xu, 1996
- Hybomitra yushuensis Chen, 1985
- Hybomitra zaballosi Portillo, 1991
- Hybomitra zancla Philip, 1954
- Hybomitra zayuensis Sun & Xu, 2007
- Hybomitra zayuensis Sun & Xu, 2007
- Hybomitra zhangi Xu, 1995
- Hybomitra zhaosuensis Wang, 1985
- Hybomitra zonalis (Kirby, 1837)
- Hybomitra zonata (Szilády, 1923)
- Hybomitra zygota (Philip, 1937)
