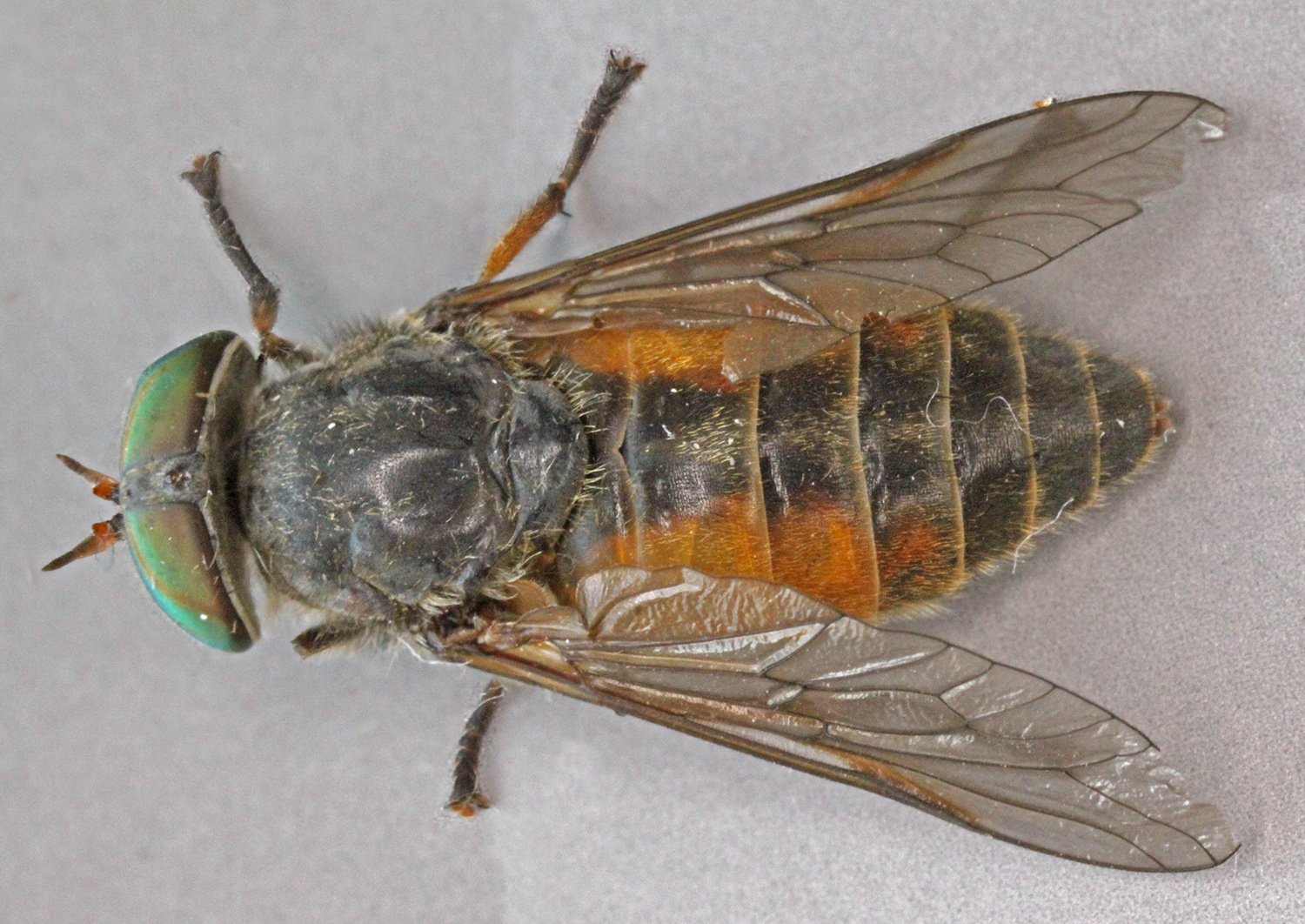
- Hybomitra distinguenda, Trawscoed, North Wales, Aug

Scientific classification
- Kingdom: Animalia
- Phylum: Arthropoda
- Clade: Pancrustacea
- Class: Insecta
- Order: Diptera
- Family: Tabanidae
- Subfamily: Tabaninae
- Tribe: Tabanini
- Genus: Hybomitra
- Species: H. distinguenda

Binomial name
- Hybomitra distinguenda (Verrall, 1909)

Synonyms
- Tabanus distinguenda Verrall, 1909

= Hybomitra distinguenda =

Species of fly

Hybomitra distinguenda is a Palearctic species of horse fly in the family Tabanidae.

== Description ==
One of the larger Hybomitra species (body length up to 16 mm) with more or less extensive yellow-orange side patches on the abdomen, and the basal antennal segment dark beneath grey dusting. Females have a broad and somewhat rectangular abdomen. It has the following combination of characters Antennal segment 1 completely dark (no orange); palps thick; facets of upper compound eyes mediocre, poorly separated from the lower ones; tergites 2 and 3 only weakly silver in hind view; median grey triangles not tall; sternite 2 with black hairs in anterior median area; tergite 3 with a narrow median stripe, less than a quarter the width of the tergite; tibiae yellow, tibia II with short equal pilosity.

== Similar species ==
Males resemble those of

- Hybomitra ciureai
- Hybomitra muehlfeldi
- Hybomitra solstitialis
