= Atylotus latistriatus =

Scientific classification
- Kingdom: Animalia
- Phylum: Arthropoda
- Clade: Pancrustacea
- Class: Insecta
- Order: Diptera
- Family: Tabanidae
- Subfamily: Tabaninae
- Tribe: Tabanini
- Genus: Atylotus
- Species: A. latistriatus

Binomial name
- Atylotus latistriatus (Brauer, 1880)

Synonyms
- Atylotus nigrifacies Gobert, 1880

Species of insect

Atylotus latistriatus is a Palearctic species of horse fly in the family Tabanidae.
