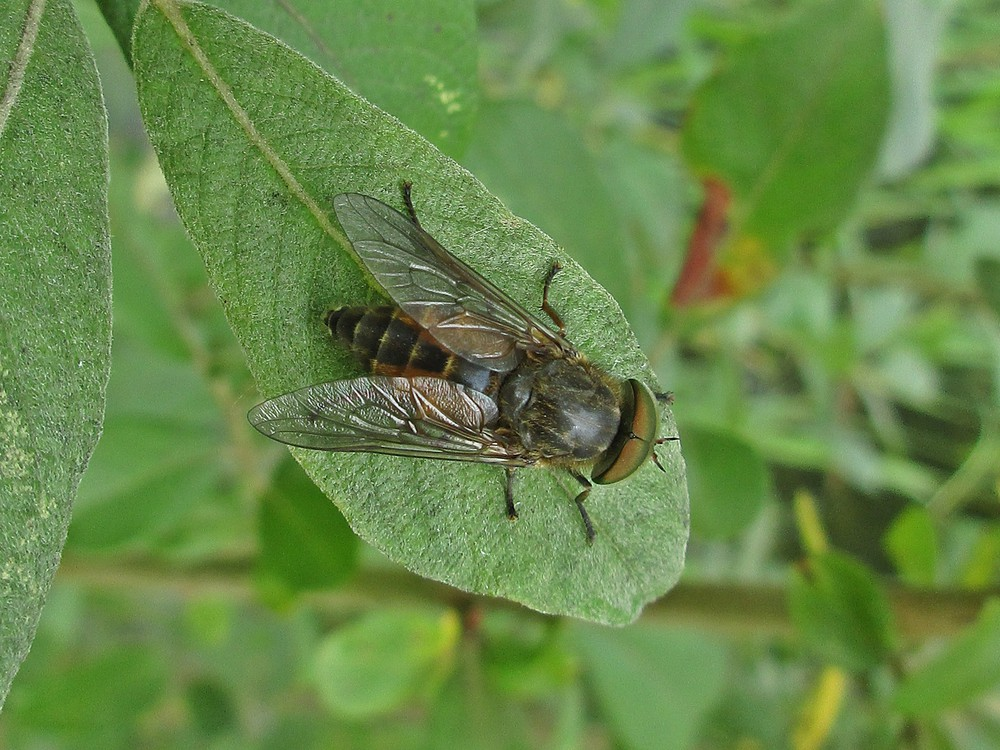

Scientific classification
- Kingdom: Animalia
- Phylum: Arthropoda
- Clade: Pancrustacea
- Class: Insecta
- Order: Diptera
- Family: Tabanidae
- Subfamily: Tabaninae
- Tribe: Tabanini
- Genus: Hybomitra
- Species: H. solstitialis

Binomial name
- Hybomitra solstitialis (Meigen, 1820)

Synonyms
- Tabanus solstitialis Meigen, 1820

= Hybomitra solstitialis =

Species of fly

Hybomitra solstitialis is a Palearctic species of horse fly in the family Tabanidae. Continental authorities apply the name solstitialis to the coastal species Hybomitra ciureai of British authorities and regard British solstitialis as var. collini of Hybomitra bimaculata.
