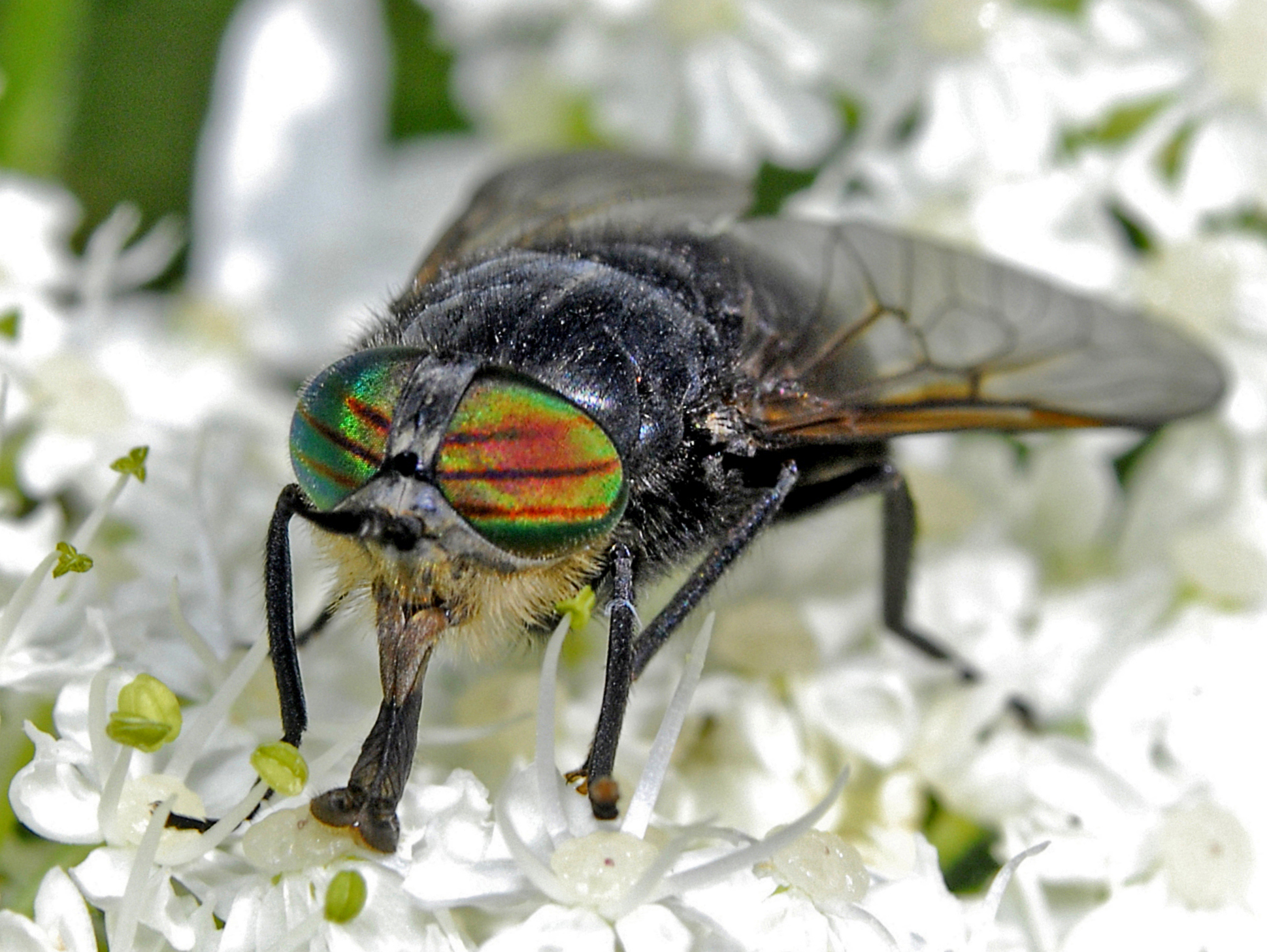
- Hybomitra aterrima var. auripila. Female

Scientific classification
- Kingdom: Animalia
- Phylum: Arthropoda
- Clade: Pancrustacea
- Class: Insecta
- Order: Diptera
- Family: Tabanidae
- Subfamily: Tabaninae
- Tribe: Tabanini
- Genus: Hybomitra
- Species: H. aterrima

Binomial name
- Hybomitra aterrima (Meigen, 1820)

Synonyms
- List: Tabanus aterrima Meigen, 1820; Tabanus heydenianus Jaennicke, 1866; Therioplectes aterrimus var. jacobi Bouvier, 1945

= Hybomitra aterrima =

Species of fly

Hybomitra aterrima is a species of horse flies in the family Tabanidae.

== Distribution ==
This species can be found in most of Europe (Austria, Bosnia, Croatia, France, Germany, Greece, Italy, Republic of Macedonia, Romania, Spain and Switzerland).

== Description ==
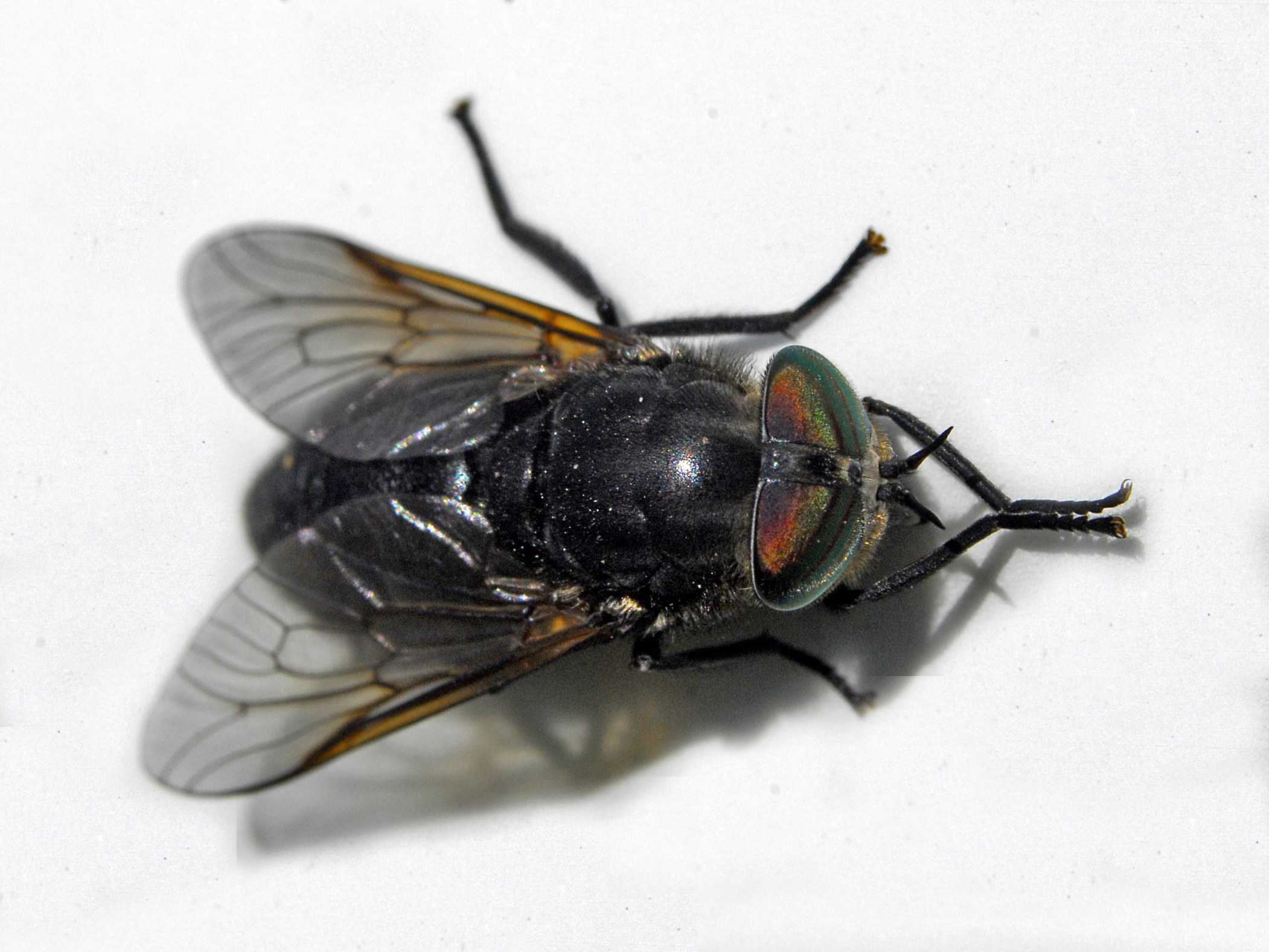
Hybomitra aterrima. Dorsal view

Hybomitra aterrima can reach a length of 13–16 millimetres (0.51–0.63 in).

The body is black and the wings are transparent, with a small dark patch at the base of the vein R4.

Face is black haired, with high antennal bows. Palpi are blackish with black hairs. The compound eyes are well-developed in both sexes. They have an iridescent light green pigmentation, with three blue-reddish transversal bands.

The Hybomitra aterrima var. auripila (Meigen) has the abdominal tergites more or less distinctly golden-yellow pubescent on posterior margins.

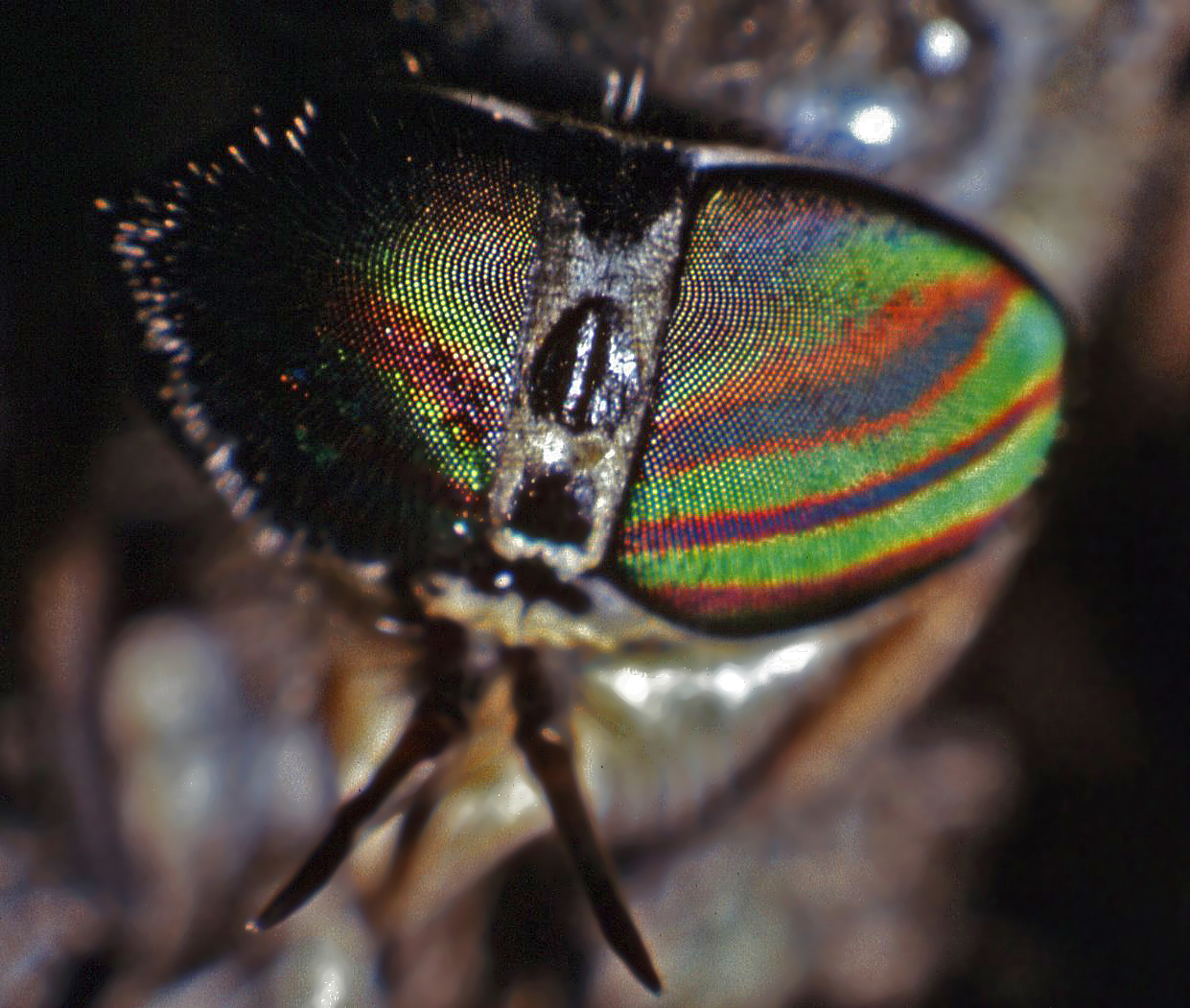
Close-up on eyes

== Biology ==
Males of these horse flies feed on plant juices, while female are bloodsuckers, feeding mainly on mammalian blood, as they require a blood meal before they are able to reproduce. They may be very annoying for cattle, but usually they do not bite people.
