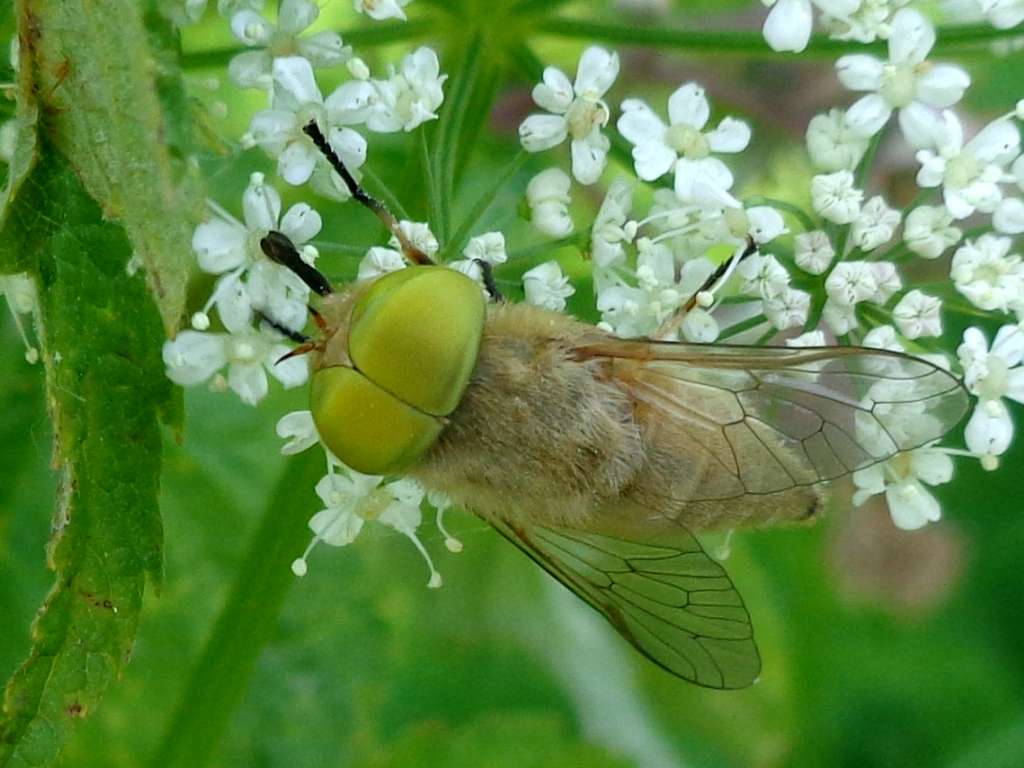
- Atylotus fulvus Latvia

Scientific classification
- Kingdom: Animalia
- Phylum: Arthropoda
- Class: Insecta
- Order: Diptera
- Family: Tabanidae
- Subfamily: Tabaninae
- Tribe: Tabanini
- Genus: Atylotus
- Species: A. fulvus

Binomial name
- Atylotus fulvus Meigen, 1804

Synonyms
- Tabanus sanguisorba Harris, 1776; Tabanus ochroleucus Meigen, 1804; Tabanus fulvus Meigen, 1804; Tabanus rufipes Meigen, 1820; Atylotus bituberculatus Bigot, 1892; Atylotus aurisquamatus Bigot, 1892; Dasystypia tunesica Enderlein, 1925; Dasystypia fulva var. flavifemur Enderlein, 1925; Tabanus fulvus ssp aureus Enderlein, 1941; Tabanus fulvus ssp. transcaucasicus Bogatchev & Samedov, 1949

= Atylotus fulvus =

Species of fly

Atylotus fulvus is a species of 'horse flies' belonging to the family Tabanidae.

== Description ==
The head of Atylotus is more strongly spherical than in Tabanus and the eyes (in preserved specimens) are usually light brown, often with a faint trace of a thin purple line. The frontal calli of Atylotus are characteristic: the two calli are small, widely separated, and very low in profile. Both of A.fulvus are covered with golden yellow hairs, which are vivid and colourful in life. The abdomen is reddish at sides, basally. No distinct abdominal pattern is visible unless the covering of mingled black and yellow hairs is rubbed away. In this species the calli are small and sometimes absent.

== Distribution ==
Europe, Russia, Morocco, Turkey.
