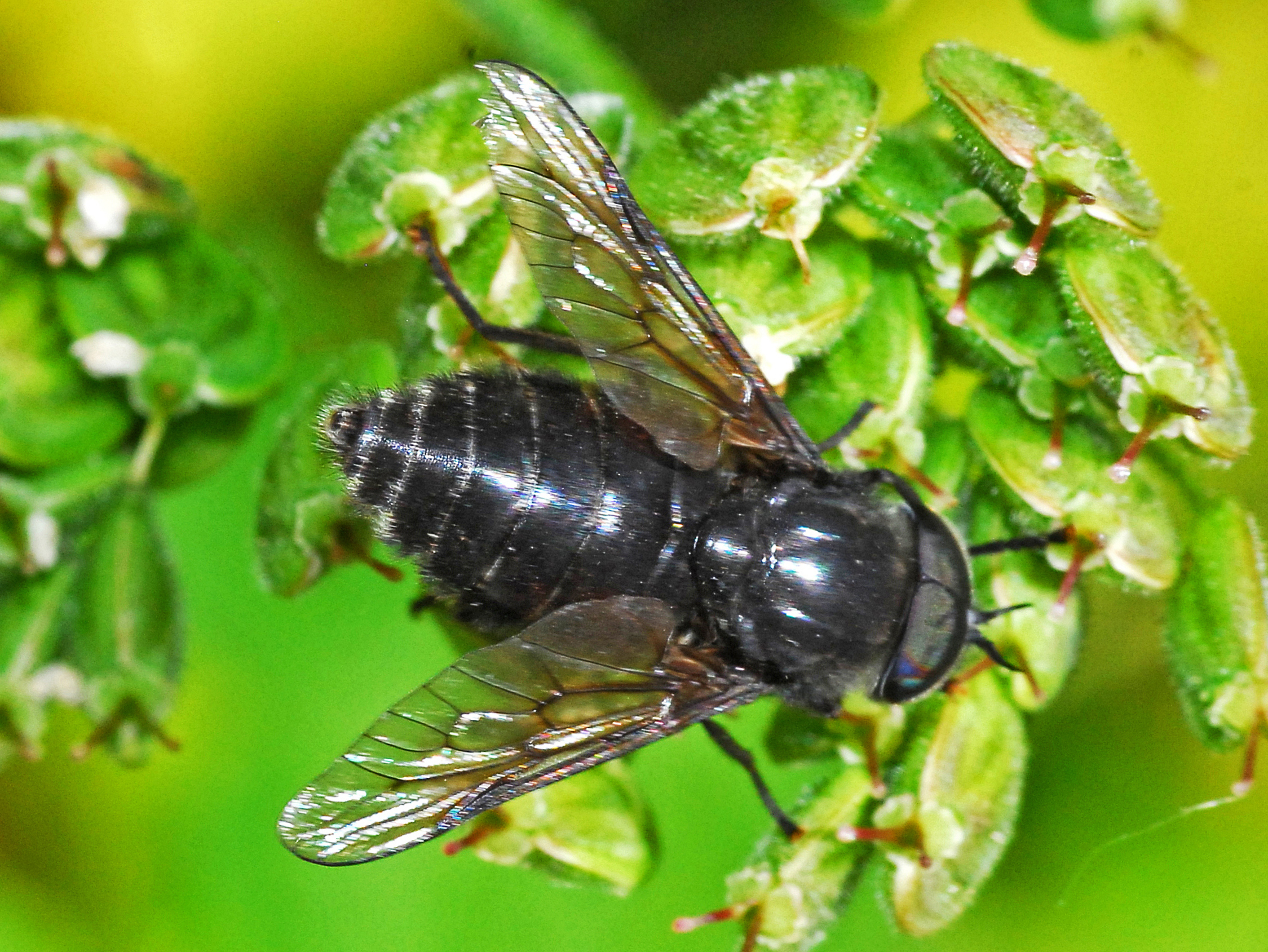
- Hybomitra caucasica. Male

Scientific classification
- Kingdom: Animalia
- Phylum: Arthropoda
- Clade: Pancrustacea
- Class: Insecta
- Order: Diptera
- Family: Tabanidae
- Subfamily: Tabaninae
- Tribe: Tabanini
- Genus: Hybomitra
- Species: H. caucasica

Binomial name
- Hybomitra caucasica (Enderlein, 1925)

Synonyms
- Hybomitra olsoufievina Philip, 1961; Hybomitra olsoufievi Philip, 1956; Sziladynus hariettae Muschamp, 1939; Sziladynus palpalis Kröber, 1939; Stonemyia caucasica Kröber, 1939; Therioplectes caucasica Enderlein, 1925; Therioplectes bimaculatus Enderlein, 1925; Tabanus tetricus Szilády, 1914

= Hybomitra caucasica =

Species of fly

Hybomitra caucasica is a species of horse flies in the family Tabanidae.

== Distribution and habitat ==
This species can be found in most of Europe (Austria, France, Germany, Italy, Spain, Switzerland, Poland and Romania) and in the Near East. These horse flies prefer mountainous regions.

== Description ==
Hybomitra caucasica can reach a length of 15 millimetres (0.59 in).The body is black and the wings are transparent. The compound eyes are well developed in both sexes.

== Biology ==
Adults can be found from June to August. Males feed on nectar and plant juices, while females are bloodsuckers, feeding mainly on mammalian blood, as they require a blood meal before they are able to reproduce.
