= Hybomitra zonalis =

Scientific classification
- Kingdom: Animalia
- Phylum: Arthropoda
- Clade: Pancrustacea
- Class: Insecta
- Order: Diptera
- Family: Tabanidae
- Subfamily: Tabaninae
- Tribe: Tabanini
- Genus: Hybomitra
- Species: H. zonalis

Binomial name
- Hybomitra zonalis (Kirby, 1837)

Synonyms
- Tabanus zonalis Kirby, 1837; Tabanus tarandi Walker, 1848; Tabanus terraenovae Macquart, 1850; Tabanus flavocinctus Bellardi, 1859

Species of fly

Hybomitra zonalis is a species of horse flies in the family Tabanidae.

== Distribution ==
Canada, United States
