= Hybomitra astuta =

Scientific classification
- Kingdom: Animalia
- Phylum: Arthropoda
- Clade: Pancrustacea
- Class: Insecta
- Order: Diptera
- Family: Tabanidae
- Subfamily: Tabaninae
- Tribe: Tabanini
- Genus: Hybomitra
- Species: H. astuta

Binomial name
- Hybomitra astuta (Osten Sacken, 1876)

Synonyms
- Tabanus astutus Osten Sacken, 1876; Hybomitra polaris ssp. viddensis Kauri, 1976; Tabanus laticallus Philip, 1936

Species of fly

Hybomitra astuta is a species of horse flies in the family Tabanidae.

== Distribution ==
Canada, United States
