= Atylotus tingaureus =

Scientific classification
- Kingdom: Animalia
- Phylum: Arthropoda
- Class: Insecta
- Order: Diptera
- Family: Tabanidae
- Subfamily: Tabaninae
- Tribe: Tabanini
- Genus: Atylotus
- Species: A. tingaureus

Binomial name
- Atylotus tingaureus (Philip, 1936)

Synonyms
- Tabanus tingaureus Philip, 1936

Species of fly

Atylotus tingaureus is a species of horse flies in the family Tabanidae.

== Distribution ==
United States.
