= Hybomitra himalayana =

Scientific classification
- Kingdom: Animalia
- Phylum: Arthropoda
- Clade: Pancrustacea
- Class: Insecta
- Order: Diptera
- Family: Tabanidae
- Subfamily: Tabaninae
- Tribe: Tabanini
- Genus: Hybomitra
- Species: H. himalayana

Binomial name
- Hybomitra himalayana (Enderlein, 1925)

Synonyms
- Therioplectes himalayana Enderlein, 1925

Species of fly

Hybomitra himalayana is a species of horse flies in the family Tabanidae.

== Distribution ==
India
