= Poeciloderas quadripunctatus =

Scientific classification
- Kingdom: Animalia
- Phylum: Arthropoda
- Class: Insecta
- Order: Diptera
- Family: Tabanidae
- Subfamily: Tabaninae
- Tribe: Tabanini
- Genus: Poeciloderas
- Species: P. quadripunctatus

Binomial name
- Poeciloderas quadripunctatus (Fabricius, 1805)

Synonyms
- Tabanus quadripunctatus Fabricius, 1805; Poecilosoma platyventris Kröber, 1931; Poecilosoma quadripunctatus var. amabilinus Philip, 1960; Tabanus amabilis Walker, 1848; Tabanus elegans Thunberg, 1827; Tabanus habilis Brèthes, 1910; Tabanus maculipennis Macquart, 1846; Tabanus nigropunctatus Bellardi, 1859; Tabanus punctipennis Macquart, 1838

Species of fly

Poeciloderas quadripunctatus is a species of horse flies in the family Tabanidae.

== Distribution ==
Mexico to Argentina.
