= Hybomitra lurida =

Scientific classification
- Kingdom: Animalia
- Phylum: Arthropoda
- Clade: Pancrustacea
- Class: Insecta
- Order: Diptera
- Family: Tabanidae
- Subfamily: Tabaninae
- Tribe: Tabanini
- Genus: Hybomitra
- Species: H. lurida

Binomial name
- Hybomitra lurida (Fallén, 1817)

Synonyms
- Tabanus luridus Fallén, 1817; Tabanus puncitfrons Wahlberg, 1848; Tabanus depressa Walker, 1848; Tabanus inscitus Walker, 1848; Tabanus comes Walker, 1849; Tabanus hirticeps Loew, 1858; Tabanus metabolus McDunnough, 1922; Hybomitra lurida var. sordida Olsufiev, 1977

Species of fly

Hybomitra lurida is a species of horse-fly in the family Tabanidae. It is found across central and Northern Europe, Asia, Canada, Alaska and portions of the contiguous United States.

== Description ==
It is a large fly, between 12 and 15 millimetres long. The subcallus is bare and there are yellow spots on the abdominal tergites.

== Habitat ==
The grown flies fly in summer, from May to the beginning of August in Canada. They prefer open landscapes, in forests and mountains. Usually, they stay around cattle.

Larval habitats include wetlands such as sphagnum bogs.

== Conservation ==
H. lurida is listed as a species of special conservation concern in Connecticut.
