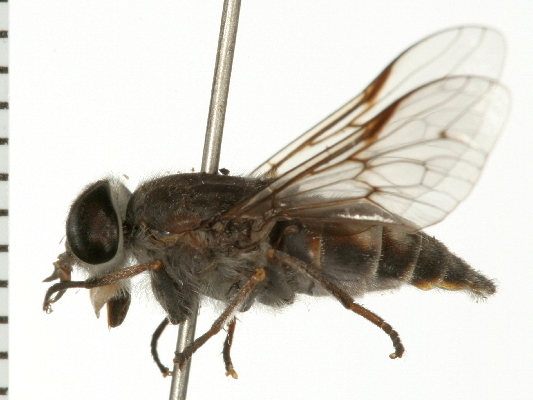
- Hybomitra illota

Scientific classification
- Kingdom: Animalia
- Phylum: Arthropoda
- Clade: Pancrustacea
- Class: Insecta
- Order: Diptera
- Family: Tabanidae
- Subfamily: Tabaninae
- Tribe: Tabanini
- Genus: Hybomitra
- Species: H. illota

Binomial name
- Hybomitra illota (Osten Sacken, 1876)

Synonyms
- Tabanus illotus Osten Sacken, 1876

= Hybomitra illota =

Species of fly

Hybomitra illota is a species of horse flies in the family Tabanidae.

== Distribution ==
Canada, United States
