= Atylotus duplex =

Scientific classification
- Kingdom: Animalia
- Phylum: Arthropoda
- Class: Insecta
- Order: Diptera
- Family: Tabanidae
- Subfamily: Tabaninae
- Tribe: Tabanini
- Genus: Atylotus
- Species: A. duplex

Binomial name
- Atylotus duplex (Walker, 1854)

Synonyms
- Tabanus imitans Walker, 1848; Tabanus duplex Walker, 1854

Species of fly

Atylotus duplex is a species of horse fly in the family Tabanidae.

== Distribution ==
Canada, United States.
