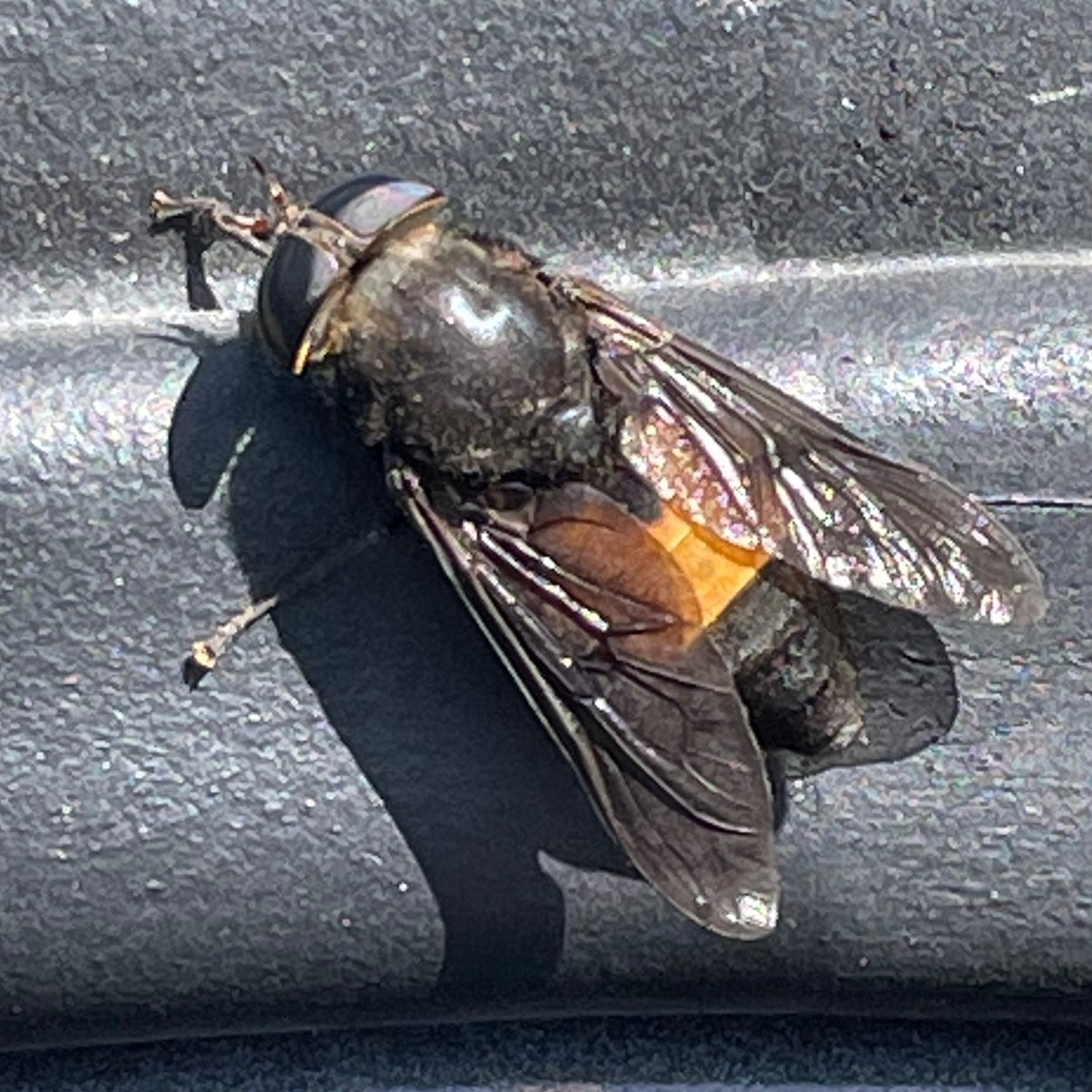

Scientific classification
- Kingdom: Animalia
- Phylum: Arthropoda
- Clade: Pancrustacea
- Class: Insecta
- Order: Diptera
- Family: Tabanidae
- Subfamily: Tabaninae
- Tribe: Tabanini
- Genus: Hybomitra
- Species: H. cincta

Binomial name
- Hybomitra cincta (Fabricius, 1794)

Synonyms
- Tabanus cinctus Fabricius, 1794

= Hybomitra cincta =

Species of fly

Hybomitra cincta is a species of horse fly in the family Tabanidae.

== Distribution ==
Canada, United States.
