= Agkistrocerus finitimus =

Scientific classification
- Kingdom: Animalia
- Phylum: Arthropoda
- Clade: Pancrustacea
- Class: Insecta
- Order: Diptera
- Family: Tabanidae
- Subfamily: Tabaninae
- Tribe: Tabanini
- Genus: Agkistrocerus
- Species: A. finitimus

Binomial name
- Agkistrocerus finitimus (Stone, 1938)

Synonyms
- Dicladocera finitimus Stone, 1938

Species of fly

Agkistrocerus finitimus is a species of horse flies in the family Tabanidae.

== Distribution ==
It is found in the United States.
