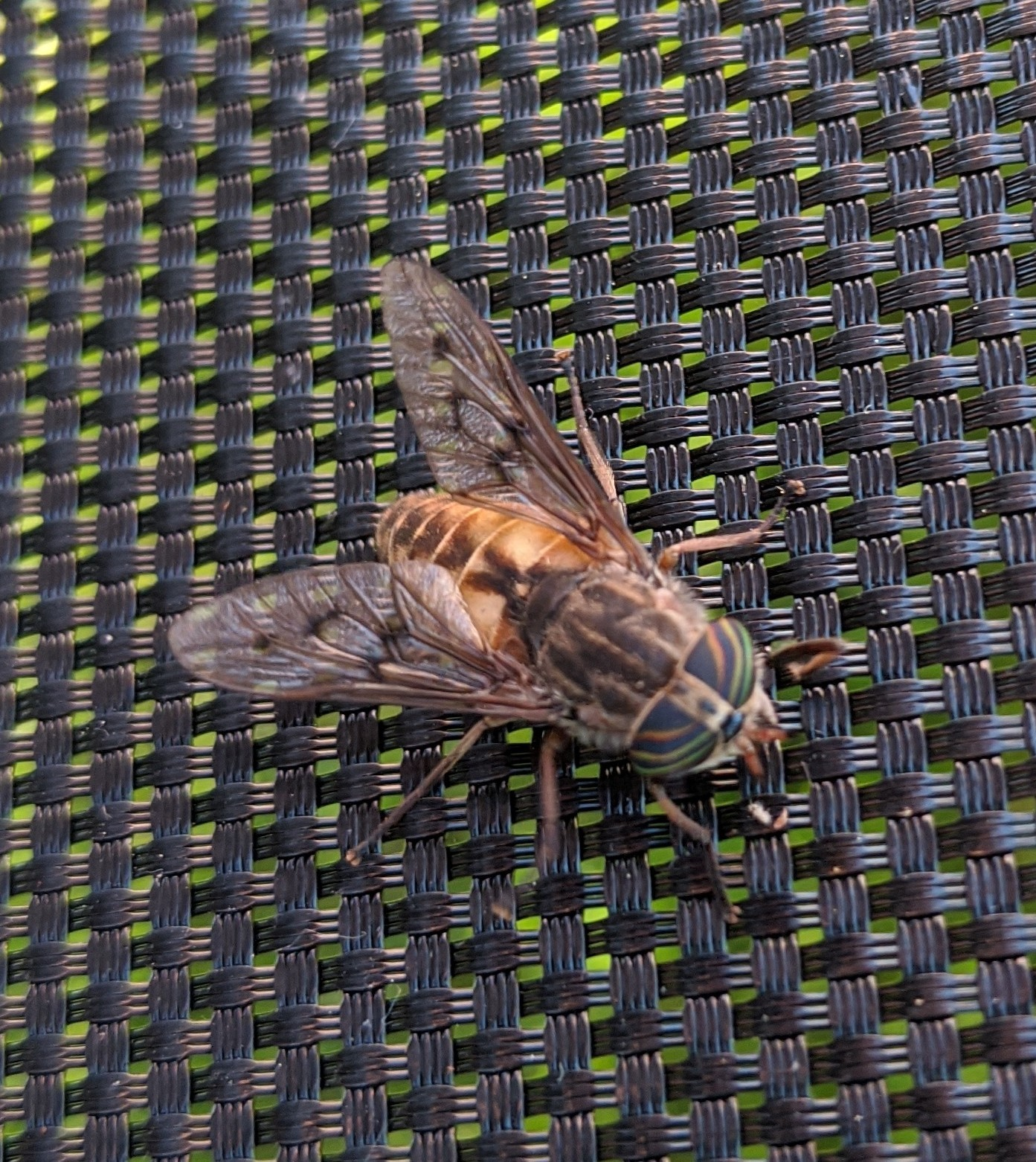
- Hybomitra lasiophthalma

Scientific classification
- Kingdom: Animalia
- Phylum: Arthropoda
- Clade: Pancrustacea
- Class: Insecta
- Order: Diptera
- Family: Tabanidae
- Subfamily: Tabaninae
- Tribe: Tabanini
- Genus: Hybomitra
- Species: H. lasiophthalma

Binomial name
- Hybomitra lasiophthalma (Macquart, 1838)

Synonyms
- Tabanus fretus Stone, 1938; Tabanus guttiferus Harris, 1925; Tabanus lasiophthalmus Macquart, 1838; Tabanus notabilis Walker, 1848; Tabanus punctipennis Macquart, 1847; Tabanus redactus Walker, 1850

= Hybomitra lasiophthalma =

Species of fly

Hybomitra lasiophthalma is a species of horse flies in the family Tabanidae.

== Distribution ==
Canada, United States
