= Hybomitra cyanops =

Scientific classification
- Kingdom: Animalia
- Phylum: Arthropoda
- Clade: Pancrustacea
- Class: Insecta
- Order: Diptera
- Family: Tabanidae
- Subfamily: Tabaninae
- Tribe: Tabanini
- Genus: Hybomitra
- Species: H. cyanops

Binomial name
- Hybomitra cyanops (Brauer, 1880)

Synonyms
- Therioplectes cyanops Brauer, 1880

Species of fly

Hybomitra cyanops is a species of horse flies belonging to the family Tabanidae. It is a Palearctic species.

== Distribution ==
Syria.
