= Hybomitra californica =

Scientific classification
- Kingdom: Animalia
- Phylum: Arthropoda
- Clade: Pancrustacea
- Class: Insecta
- Order: Diptera
- Family: Tabanidae
- Subfamily: Tabaninae
- Tribe: Tabanini
- Genus: Hybomitra
- Species: H. californica

Binomial name
- Hybomitra californica (Marten, 1882)

Synonyms
- Tabanus californicus Marten, 1882

Species of fly

Hybomitra californica is a species of horse flies in the family Tabanidae.

== Distribution ==
Canada, United States
