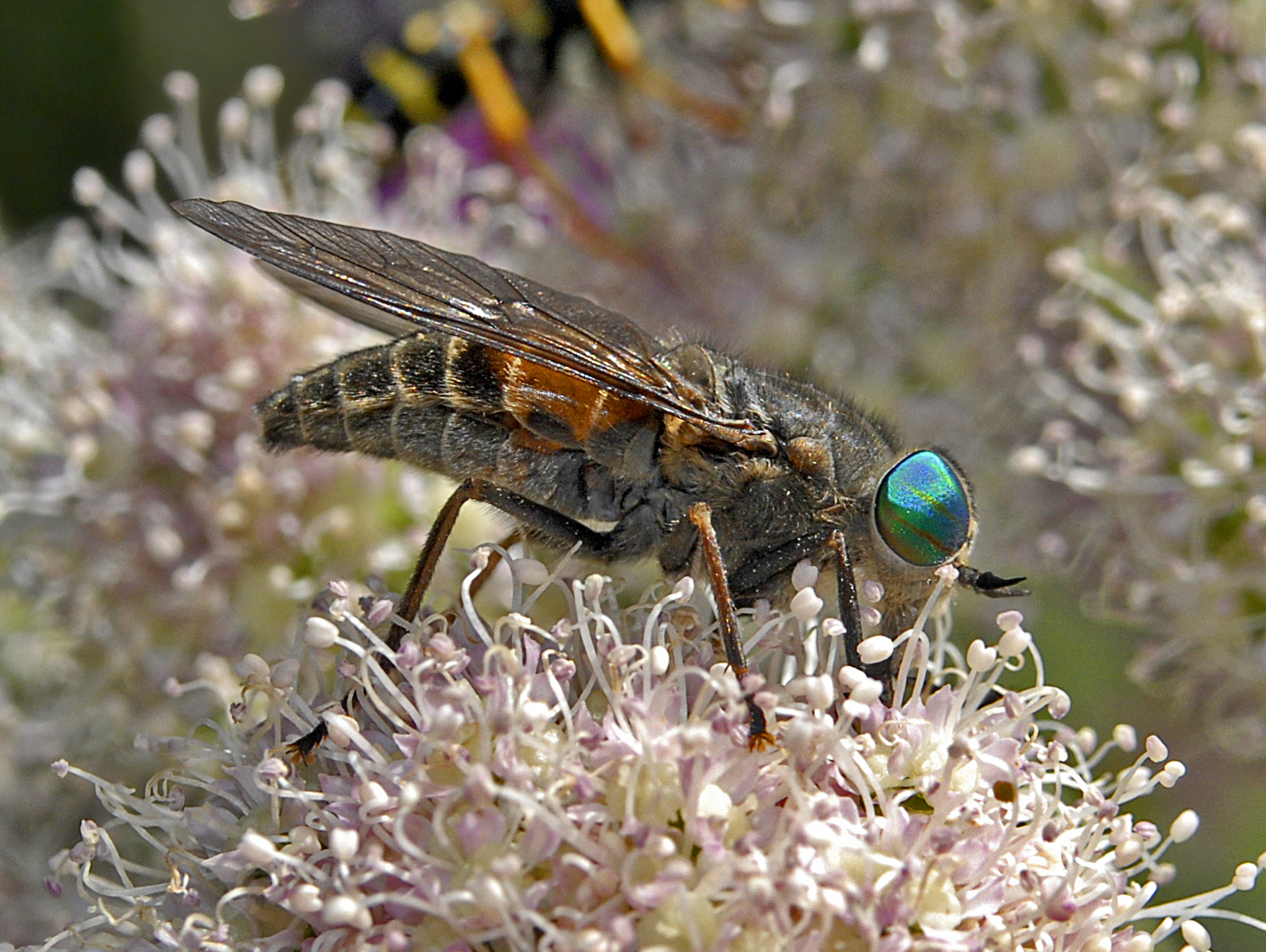
- Ventral view
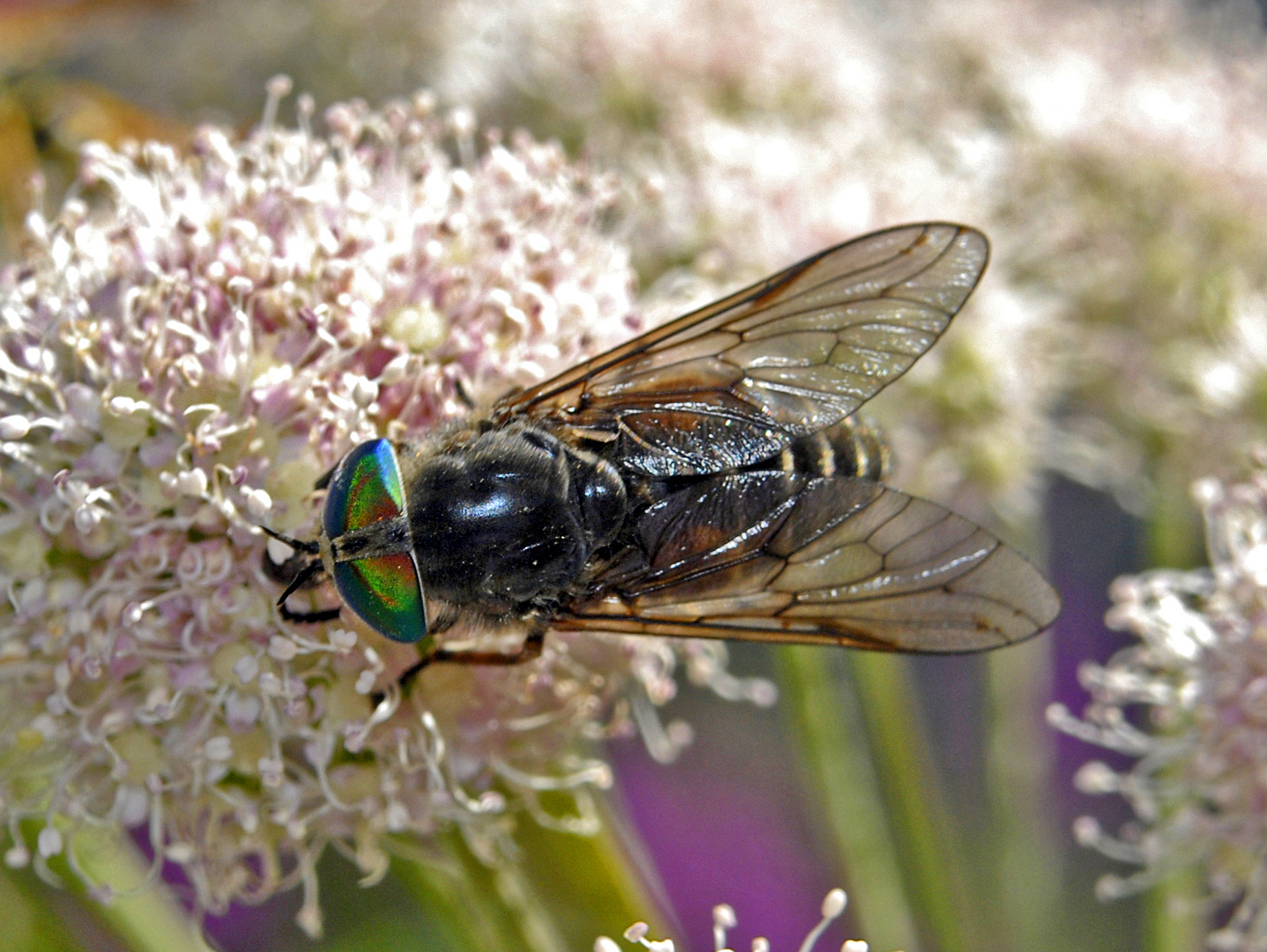
- Dorsal view

Scientific classification
- Kingdom: Animalia
- Phylum: Arthropoda
- Clade: Pancrustacea
- Class: Insecta
- Order: Diptera
- Family: Tabanidae
- Subfamily: Tabaninae
- Tribe: Tabanini
- Genus: Hybomitra
- Species: H. montana

Binomial name
- Hybomitra montana (Meigen, 1820)

Synonyms
- Tabanus montana Meigen, 1820; Tabanus flaviceps Zetterstedt, 1842; Tabanus braueri Villeneuve, 1908; Therioplectes montana var. immaculiventris Kröber, 1923; Therioplectes montanus var. bezzii Surcouf, 1924; Therioplectes borealis var. bimaculata Enderlein, 1925; Therioplectes sachalinensis Enderlein, 1925; Stypommia ochotscana Enderlein, 1934; Sziladynus calluneticola Kröber, 1935; Tabanus montanus f. obscura Olsufiev, 1937; Tabanus karatschajensis Skufi'n, 1938; Sziladynus montanus var. alpicola Muschamp, 1939; Tabanus aino Kono & Takahasi, 1939; Hybomitra manchuriensis Philip, 1956

= Hybomitra montana =

Species of fly

Hybomitra montana, the slender-horned horsefly, is a species of horse flies in the family Tabanidae.

== Description ==
Hybomitra montana can reach a length of 12.5–16 millimetres (0.49–0.63 in). The body is black, the hairy abdomen is yellow with black stripes and the wings are brownish but transparent. The compound eyes are well developed in both sexes. They have bright blue-green eyes, with transversal red bands.

Adult horse flies can be found in July and August. Males of this species feed on plant juices, while females are blood drinkers. The females have a high fecundity. They can lay about 500 eggs at an oviposition. The larvae pass through 10–13 instars, and the full life-cycle lasts 3–5 years. This horsefly may cause appreciable damages on stock farms.

== Distribution ==
This species can be found in most of Europe and in the eastern Palearctic realm.

== Habitat ==
These horseflies live in various open landscapes, from mountains to peatlands and salt marshes.
