= Hybomitra arpadi =

Scientific classification
- Kingdom: Animalia
- Phylum: Arthropoda
- Clade: Pancrustacea
- Class: Insecta
- Order: Diptera
- Family: Tabanidae
- Subfamily: Tabaninae
- Tribe: Tabanini
- Genus: Hybomitra
- Species: H. arpadi

Binomial name
- Hybomitra arpadi (Szilády, 1923)

Synonyms
- Tabanus arpadi Szilády, 1923; Tabanus cristatus Curran, 1927; Tabanus gracilipalpis Hine, 1923; Tabanus stackelbergi Olsufiev, 1933

Species of fly

Hybomitra arpadi is a species of horse flies in the family Tabanidae.

== Distribution ==
Canada, United States
