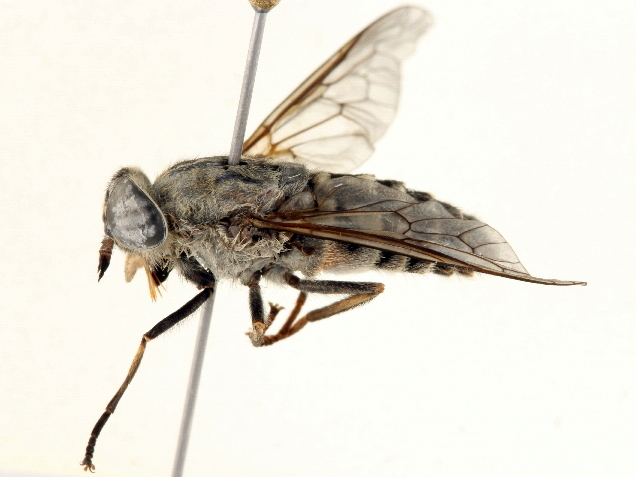
- Hybomitra rhombica

Scientific classification
- Kingdom: Animalia
- Phylum: Arthropoda
- Clade: Pancrustacea
- Class: Insecta
- Order: Diptera
- Family: Tabanidae
- Subfamily: Tabaninae
- Tribe: Tabanini
- Genus: Hybomitra
- Species: H. rhombica

Binomial name
- Hybomitra rhombica (Osten Sacken, 1876)

Synonyms
- Tabanus rhombica Osten Sacken, 1876; Tabanus centron Marten, 1882; Hybomitra solox Enderlein, 1922

= Hybomitra rhombica =

Species of fly

Hybomitra rhombica is a species of horse flies in the family Tabanidae.

== Distribution ==
United States
