= Atylotus bicolor =

Scientific classification
- Kingdom: Animalia
- Phylum: Arthropoda
- Class: Insecta
- Order: Diptera
- Family: Tabanidae
- Subfamily: Tabaninae
- Tribe: Tabanini
- Genus: Atylotus
- Species: A. bicolor

Binomial name
- Atylotus bicolor (Wiedemann, 1821)

Synonyms
- Tabanus bicolor Wiedemann, 1821; Tabanus fulvescens Walker, 1848; Tabanus ruficeps Macquart, 1855

Species of insect

Atylotus bicolor is a species of horse fly in the family Tabanidae. The species typically breeds in freshwater marshes. Larvae can be found in bogs, swamps, or in the soil of a riparian zone.

== Distribution ==
United States
