= Hamatabanus carolinensis =

Scientific classification
- Kingdom: Animalia
- Phylum: Arthropoda
- Class: Insecta
- Order: Diptera
- Family: Tabanidae
- Subfamily: Tabaninae
- Tribe: Tabanini
- Genus: Hamatabanus
- Species: H. carolinensis

Binomial name
- Hamatabanus carolinensis (Macquart, 1838)

Synonyms
- Tabanus carolinensis Macquart, 1838; Tabanus cerastes Osten Sacken, 1876; Tabanus frater Kröber, 1934; Tabanus fraterna Kröber, 1931; Tabanus hirtioculatus Macquart, 1855; Tabanus scitus Walker, 1848

Species of fly

Hamatabanus carolinensis is a species of horse flies in the family Tabanidae.

== Distribution ==
United States, Mexico.
