= Neaera (fly) =

Scientific classification
- Kingdom: Animalia
- Phylum: Arthropoda
- Class: Insecta
- Order: Diptera
- Family: Tachinidae
- Subfamily: Tachininae
- Tribe: Neaerini
- Genus: Neaera; Robineau-Desvoidy, 1830

Type species
- Neaera immaculata Robineau-Desvoidy, 1830

Synonyms
- Acronarista Townsend, 1908; Acronaristopsis Townsend, 1919; Dichaetoneura Johnson, 1907; Euryceromyia Townsend, 1892; Glaucophana Brauer & von Berganstamm, 1891; Naeera Gobert, 1887; Neera Rondani, 1861; Thapsia Robineau-Desvoidy, 1863

Genus of flies

Neaera is a genus of flies in the family Tachinidae.

== Species ==
- Neaera adunata (Reinhard, 1961)
- Neaera atra Robineau-Desvoidy, 1850
- Neaera bahamensis (Townsend, 1919)
- Neaera laticornis (Meigen, 1824)
- Neaera leucoptera (Johnson, 1907)
- Neaera mirabilis (Townsend, 1908)
- Neaera robertsonii (Townsend, 1892)
- Neaera tenuiforceps Mesnil, 1963
- Neaera zhangi Wang & Zhang, 2012
