= Neaera laticornis =

Scientific classification
- Kingdom: Animalia
- Phylum: Arthropoda
- Clade: Pancrustacea
- Class: Insecta
- Order: Diptera
- Family: Tachinidae
- Subfamily: Tachininae
- Tribe: Neaerini
- Genus: Neaera
- Species: N. laticornis

Binomial name
- Neaera laticornis (Meigen, 1824)

Synonyms
- Tachina laticornis Meigen, 1824; Tachina albicollis Meigen, 1824; Neaera immaculata Robineau-Desvoidy, 1830; Dichaetoneura leucoptera Johnson, 1907

Species of fly

Neaera laticornis is a European species of fly in the family Tachinidae.

== Distribution ==
Turkmenistan, China, British Isles, Hungary, Italy, Spain, Turkey, France, Israel, Mongolia, Russia, Transcaucasia.
