= Hybomitra captonis =

Scientific classification
- Kingdom: Animalia
- Phylum: Arthropoda
- Clade: Pancrustacea
- Class: Insecta
- Order: Diptera
- Family: Tabanidae
- Subfamily: Tabaninae
- Tribe: Tabanini
- Genus: Hybomitra
- Species: H. captonis

Binomial name
- Hybomitra captonis (Marten, 1882)

Synonyms
- Tabanus captonis Marten, 1882; Tabanus comastes Williston, 1887; Tabanus recedens Walker, 1854

Species of fly

Hybomitra captonis is a species of horse fly in the family Tabanidae.

== Distribution ==
Canada, United States
