= Hybomitra epistates =

Scientific classification
- Kingdom: Animalia
- Phylum: Arthropoda
- Clade: Pancrustacea
- Class: Insecta
- Order: Diptera
- Family: Tabanidae
- Subfamily: Tabaninae
- Tribe: Tabanini
- Genus: Hybomitra
- Species: H. epistates

Binomial name
- Hybomitra epistates (Osten Sacken, 1878)

Synonyms
- Tabanus epistates Osten Sacken, 1878; Tabanus socius Osten Sacken, 1876

Species of fly

Hybomitra epistates is a species of horse flies in the family Tabanidae.

== Distribution ==
Canada, United States.
