= Hybomitra hirta =

Scientific classification
- Kingdom: Animalia
- Phylum: Arthropoda
- Clade: Pancrustacea
- Class: Insecta
- Order: Diptera
- Family: Tabanidae
- Subfamily: Tabaninae
- Tribe: Tabanini
- Genus: Hybomitra
- Species: H. hirta

Binomial name
- Hybomitra hirta (Walker, 1850)

Synonyms
- Tabanus hirtus Walker, 1850

Species of fly

Hybomitra hirta is an Asian species of horse fly in the family Tabanidae.

== Distribution ==
India.
