= Hybomitra sodalis =

Scientific classification
- Kingdom: Animalia
- Phylum: Arthropoda
- Clade: Pancrustacea
- Class: Insecta
- Order: Diptera
- Family: Tabanidae
- Subfamily: Tabaninae
- Tribe: Tabanini
- Genus: Hybomitra
- Species: H. sodalis

Binomial name
- Hybomitra sodalis (Williston, 1887)

Synonyms
- Tabanus sodalis Williston, 1887; Tabanus aestivalis Harris, 1925

Species of fly

Hybomitra sodalis is a species of horse flies in the family Tabanidae.

== Distribution ==
United States
