= Agkistrocerus megerlei =

Scientific classification
- Kingdom: Animalia
- Phylum: Arthropoda
- Clade: Pancrustacea
- Class: Insecta
- Order: Diptera
- Family: Tabanidae
- Subfamily: Tabaninae
- Tribe: Tabanini
- Genus: Agkistrocerus
- Species: A. megerlei

Binomial name
- Agkistrocerus megerlei (Wiedemann, 1828)

Synonyms
- Tabanus megerlei Wiedemann, 1828

Species of fly

Agkistrocerus megerlei is a species of horse flies in the family Tabanidae.

== Distribution ==
A. megerlei is found in the United States.
