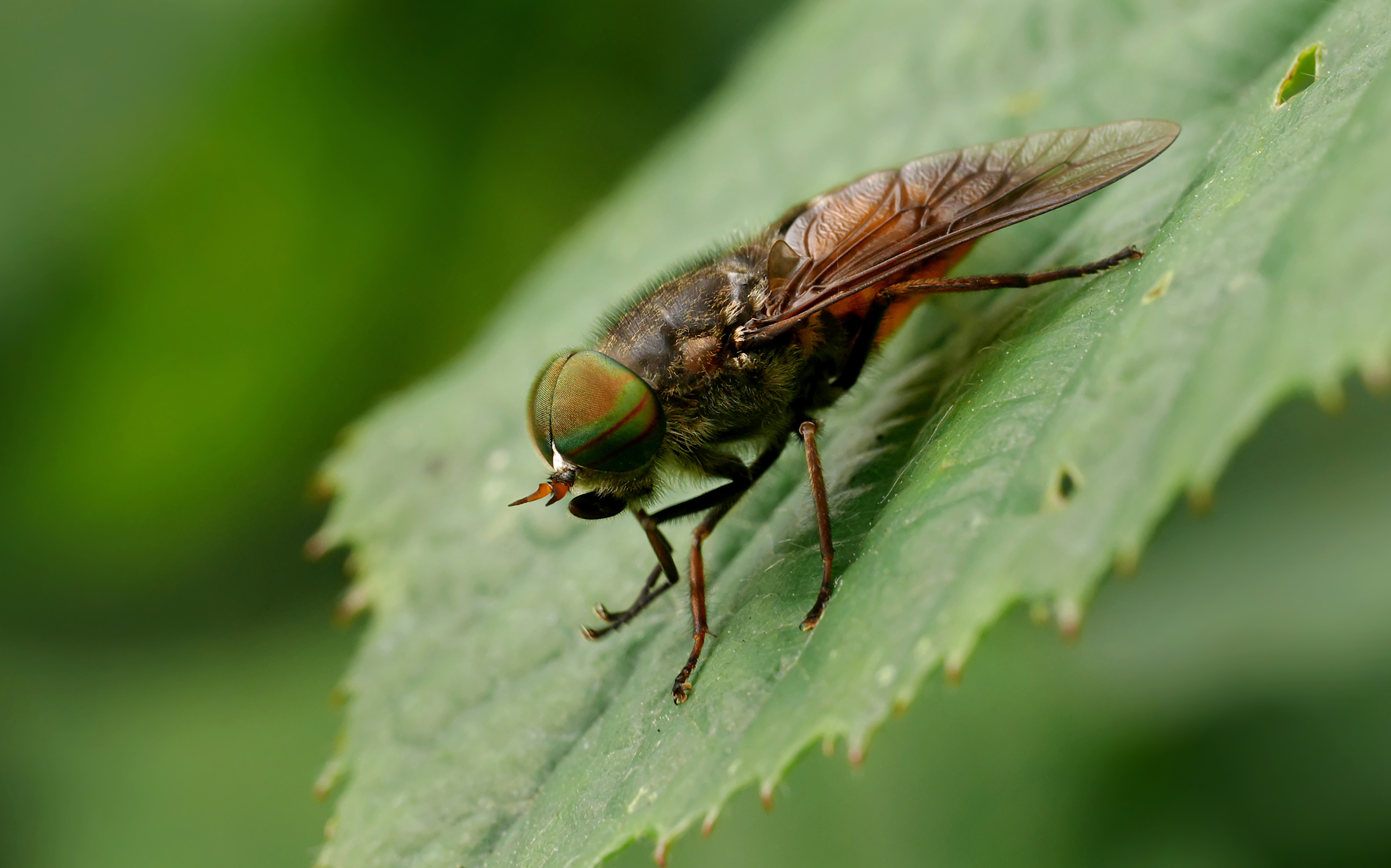

Scientific classification
- Kingdom: Animalia
- Phylum: Arthropoda
- Clade: Pancrustacea
- Class: Insecta
- Order: Diptera
- Family: Tabanidae
- Subfamily: Tabaninae
- Tribe: Tabanini
- Genus: Hybomitra
- Species: H. muehlfeldi

Binomial name
- Hybomitra muehlfeldi (Brauer, 1880)

Synonyms
- Therioplectes muehlfeldi Brauer, 1880; Therioplectes montanus var. sunorus Surcouf, 1924

= Hybomitra muehlfeldi =

Species of fly

Hybomitra muehlfeldi is a species of horse flies belonging to the family Tabanidae. It is a Palearctic species with a limited distribution in Europe.

The body length of the imago is 11–16.5 mm. In females, the eyes have three stripes and are covered with brown-gray hairs. In males, the lower ommatidia are smaller than the upper ones. The frontal stripe between the eyes is narrow. The third segment of the antenna is reddish-brown, with a black tip. The notopleura are dark brown. The primary color of the femora is black-gray, and the tibiae are yellow-brown. The abdomen is dark with yellowish-brown spots on the sides of the first three tergites. The rear edge of the tergites has faint grey triangular spots, which may fade in older individuals. The abdominal sternites are yellow-brown. There is a black spot in the middle of the second sternite. The last three sternites are black-grey. It is similar to Hybomitra ciureai.
