= Hybomitra difficilis =

Scientific classification
- Kingdom: Animalia
- Phylum: Arthropoda
- Clade: Pancrustacea
- Class: Insecta
- Order: Diptera
- Family: Tabanidae
- Subfamily: Tabaninae
- Tribe: Tabanini
- Genus: Hybomitra
- Species: H. difficilis

Binomial name
- Hybomitra difficilis (Wiedemann, 1828)

Synonyms
- Tabanus difficilis Wiedemann, 1828

Species of fly

Hybomitra difficilis is a species of horse flies in the family Tabanidae.

== Distribution ==
United States.
