= Hybomitra fulvilateralis =

Scientific classification
- Kingdom: Animalia
- Phylum: Arthropoda
- Clade: Pancrustacea
- Class: Insecta
- Order: Diptera
- Family: Tabanidae
- Subfamily: Tabaninae
- Tribe: Tabanini
- Genus: Hybomitra
- Species: H. fulvilateralis

Binomial name
- Hybomitra fulvilateralis (Macquart, 1838)

Synonyms
- Tabanus fulvilateralis Macquart, 1838; Tabanus haemaphorus Marten, 1882; Hybostraba guttiventris Enderlein, 1923

Species of fly

Hybomitra fulvilateralis is a species of horse flies in the family Tabanidae.

== Distribution ==
Canada, United States
