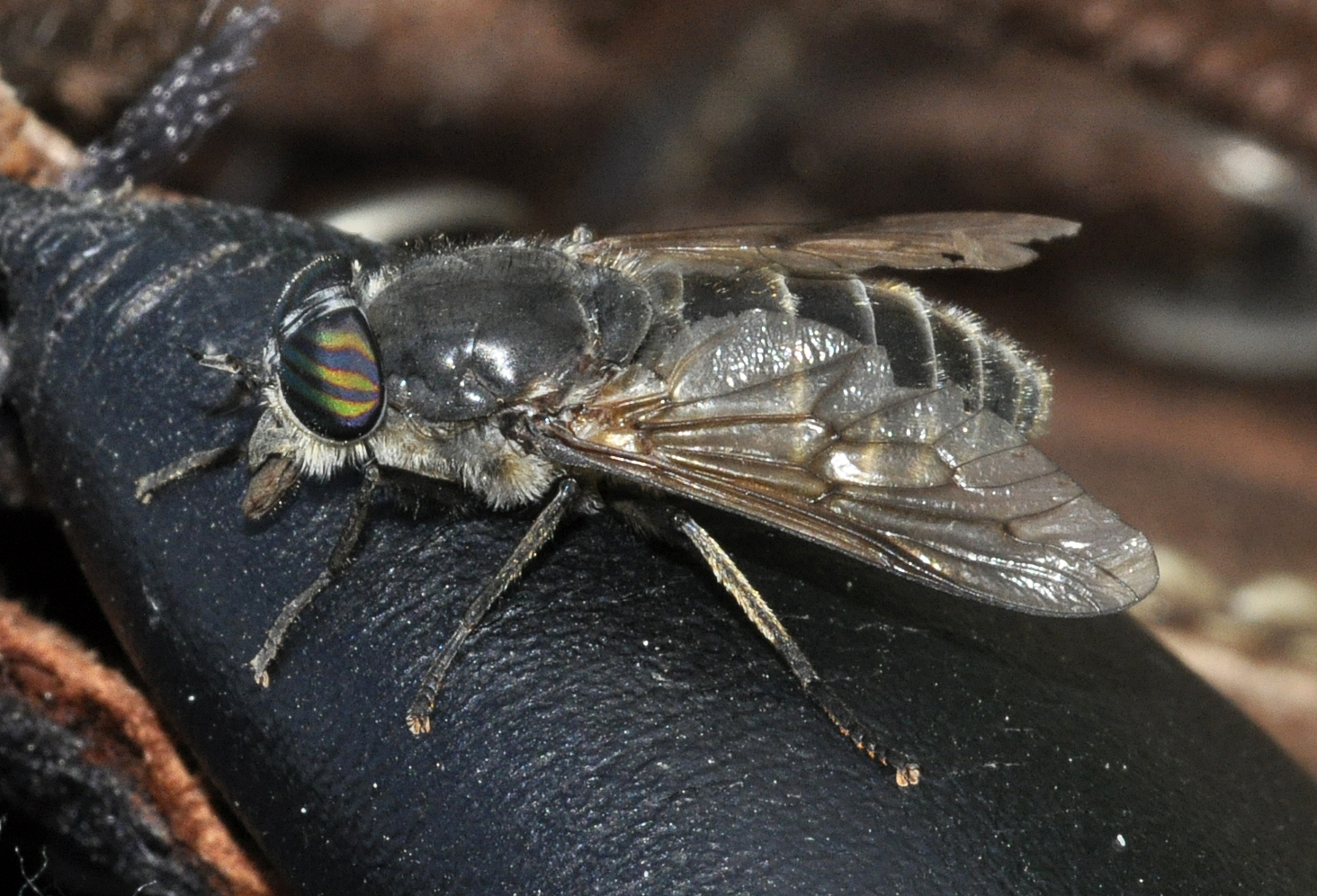
- Hybomitra auripila

Scientific classification
- Kingdom: Animalia
- Phylum: Arthropoda
- Clade: Pancrustacea
- Class: Insecta
- Order: Diptera
- Family: Tabanidae
- Subfamily: Tabaninae
- Tribe: Tabanini
- Genus: Hybomitra
- Species: H. auripila

Binomial name
- Hybomitra auripila (Meigen, 1820)

Synonyms
- Tabanus auripilus Meigen, 1820; Tabanus aethiops Ljungh, 1823; Tabanus lugubris Zetterstedt, 1838; Tabanus nigerrima Zetterstedt, 1842

= Hybomitra auripila =

Species of fly

Hybomitra auripila is a Palearctic species of horse fly in the family Tabanidae.

== Distribution ==
Europe
