= Hybomitra macularis =

Scientific classification
- Kingdom: Animalia
- Phylum: Arthropoda
- Clade: Pancrustacea
- Class: Insecta
- Order: Diptera
- Family: Tabanidae
- Subfamily: Tabaninae
- Tribe: Tabanini
- Genus: Hybomitra
- Species: H. macularis

Binomial name
- Hybomitra macularis (Fabricius, 1794)

Synonyms
- Tabanus macularis Fabricius, 1794; Tabanus trichocera Bigot, 1892

Species of fly

Hybomitra macularis is a species of horse flies in the family Tabanidae.

== Distribution ==
Morocco
