= Hybomitra hinei =

Scientific classification
- Kingdom: Animalia
- Phylum: Arthropoda
- Clade: Pancrustacea
- Class: Insecta
- Order: Diptera
- Family: Tabanidae
- Subfamily: Tabaninae
- Tribe: Tabanini
- Genus: Hybomitra
- Species: H. hinei

Binomial name
- Hybomitra hinei (Johnson, 1904)

Synonyms
- Tabanus hinei Johnson, 1904; Tabanus wrighti Whitney, 1915; Therioplactes politus Johnson, 1900

Species of fly

Hybomitra hinei is a species of horse fly in the family Tabanidae. A male Hybomitra hinei wrighti has been recorded reaching speeds of up to 145 km (90 mi) per hour when pursuing a female.

== Distribution ==
Canada, United States
