= Hybomitra frontalis =

Scientific classification
- Kingdom: Animalia
- Phylum: Arthropoda
- Clade: Pancrustacea
- Class: Insecta
- Order: Diptera
- Family: Tabanidae
- Subfamily: Tabaninae
- Tribe: Tabanini
- Genus: Hybomitra
- Species: H. frontalis

Binomial name
- Hybomitra frontalis (Walker, 1848)

Synonyms
- Tabanus canadensis Curran, 1927; Tabanus frontalis Walker, 1848; Tabanus incisus Walker, 1850; Tabanus septentrionalis Loew, 1858; Tylostypia labradorensis Enderlein, 1925

Species of fly

Hybomitra frontalis is a species of horse flies in the family Tabanidae.

== Distribution ==
Canada, United States
