= Hybomitra atrobasis =

Scientific classification
- Kingdom: Animalia
- Phylum: Arthropoda
- Clade: Pancrustacea
- Class: Insecta
- Order: Diptera
- Family: Tabanidae
- Subfamily: Tabaninae
- Tribe: Tabanini
- Genus: Hybomitra
- Species: H. atrobasis

Binomial name
- Hybomitra atrobasis (McDunnough, 1921)

Synonyms
- Tabanus atrobasis McDunnough, 1921

Species of fly

Hybomitra atrobasis is a species of horse flies in the family Tabanidae.

== Distribution ==
Canada, United States
