= Atylotus plebeius =

Scientific classification
- Kingdom: Animalia
- Phylum: Arthropoda
- Clade: Pancrustacea
- Class: Insecta
- Order: Diptera
- Family: Tabanidae
- Subfamily: Tabaninae
- Tribe: Tabanini
- Genus: Atylotus
- Species: A. plebeius

Binomial name
- Atylotus plebeius (Fallen, 1817)

Synonyms
- Tabanus plebeius Fallén, 1817; Tabanus laniger Meigen, 1820; Tabanus oethereus ssp. transilvanicus Dinulescu, 1953; Tabanus plebejus var. calvus Szilády, 1915; Tabanus plebeyus ssp. carpaticus Dinulescu, 1953; Tabanus sibiricus Olsufiev, 1936; Therioplectes aethereus Bigot, 1892

Species of fly

Atylotus plebeius is a Palearctic species of horse fly in the family Tabanidae.
