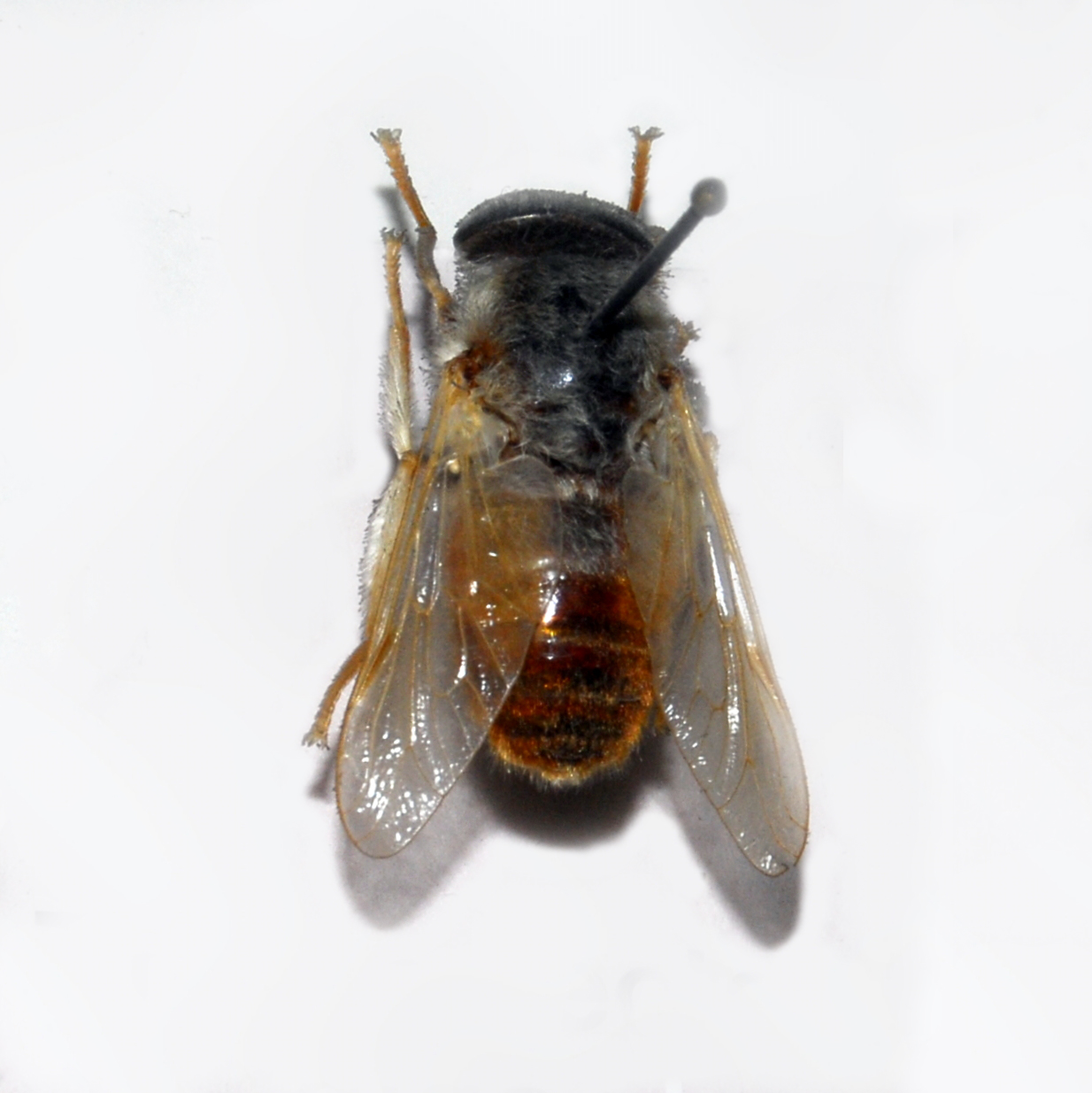
- Therioplectes gigas

Scientific classification
- Kingdom: Animalia
- Phylum: Arthropoda
- Class: Insecta
- Order: Diptera
- Family: Tabanidae
- Subfamily: Tabaninae
- Tribe: Tabanini
- Genus: Therioplectes
- Species: T. gigas

Binomial name
- Therioplectes gigas (Herbst, 1787)

Synonyms
- Tabanus gigas Herbst, 1787; Tabanus grossus Thunberg, 1827; Brachytomus ursus Costa, 1857; Tabanus albipes Fabricius, 1794; Tabanus ignotus Rossi, 1790

= Therioplectes gigas =

Species of fly

Therioplectes gigas is horse fly in the family Tabanidae. The species was first described by Johann Friedrich Wilhelm Herbst in 1787.

== Distribution ==
This species is present in most of Central and Southern Europe.

== Description ==
Therioplectes gigas can reach a length of 22–23 millimetres (0.87–0.91 in).
