= Atylotus palus =

Scientific classification
- Kingdom: Animalia
- Phylum: Arthropoda
- Class: Insecta
- Order: Diptera
- Family: Tabanidae
- Subfamily: Tabaninae
- Tribe: Tabanini
- Genus: Atylotus
- Species: A. palus

Binomial name
- Atylotus palus Teskey, 1985

Species of fly

Atylotus palus is a species of horse flies in the family Tabanidae.

== Distribution ==
United States.
