= Hybomitra affinis =

Scientific classification
- Kingdom: Animalia
- Phylum: Arthropoda
- Clade: Pancrustacea
- Class: Insecta
- Order: Diptera
- Family: Tabanidae
- Subfamily: Tabaninae
- Tribe: Tabanini
- Genus: Hybomitra
- Species: H. affinis

Binomial name
- Hybomitra affinis (Kirby, 1837)

Synonyms
- Tabanus affinis Kirby, 1837; Tabanus sordidus Walker, 1854; Tabanus triligatus Walker, 1854

Species of fly

Hybomitra affinis is a species of horse flies in the family Tabanidae. It is also known as the moose-fly. Only the female is known to bite.

== In culture ==
According to Frank G. Speck, among the Naskapi of Sept-Îles, in Quebec, the insect is generally known as misəna'k‘^{w}, those of Mistassini as mici˙cak‘^{w} and those who frequent Lake St. John as mi◌̇ctsina'k‘^{w}. Of these terms, the second at least means "big biter". Among some of the Naskapi and Mistassini, the insect is also known as "he who governs fish" or "the master of the fish" (Naskapi təpənəmə'k nəme'c, Mistassini katəpe˙'i˙mat nəme'ca). As such, the fly visits people who are fishing and observes to ensure that its subjects are being treated appropriately, specifically not being fished and consumed wastefully. The fly bites the fishermen to ensure they remain mindful of the fly's surveillance. There is, however, some debate about whether Speck had understood his sources correctly.

== Distribution ==
Hybomitra affinis is found in North America and "is among the most abundant and widely distributed species of Tabanidae in Canada and is an important pest throughout its dominantly woodland habitat". The distribution extends from western Alaska to easternmost Canada, extending south to Arizona in the west and New England in the east. "Larvae have been found in saturated moss or other predominantly organic materials around swampy woodland pools, marshy lakeshores, willow swamps, and sphagnum bogs."
