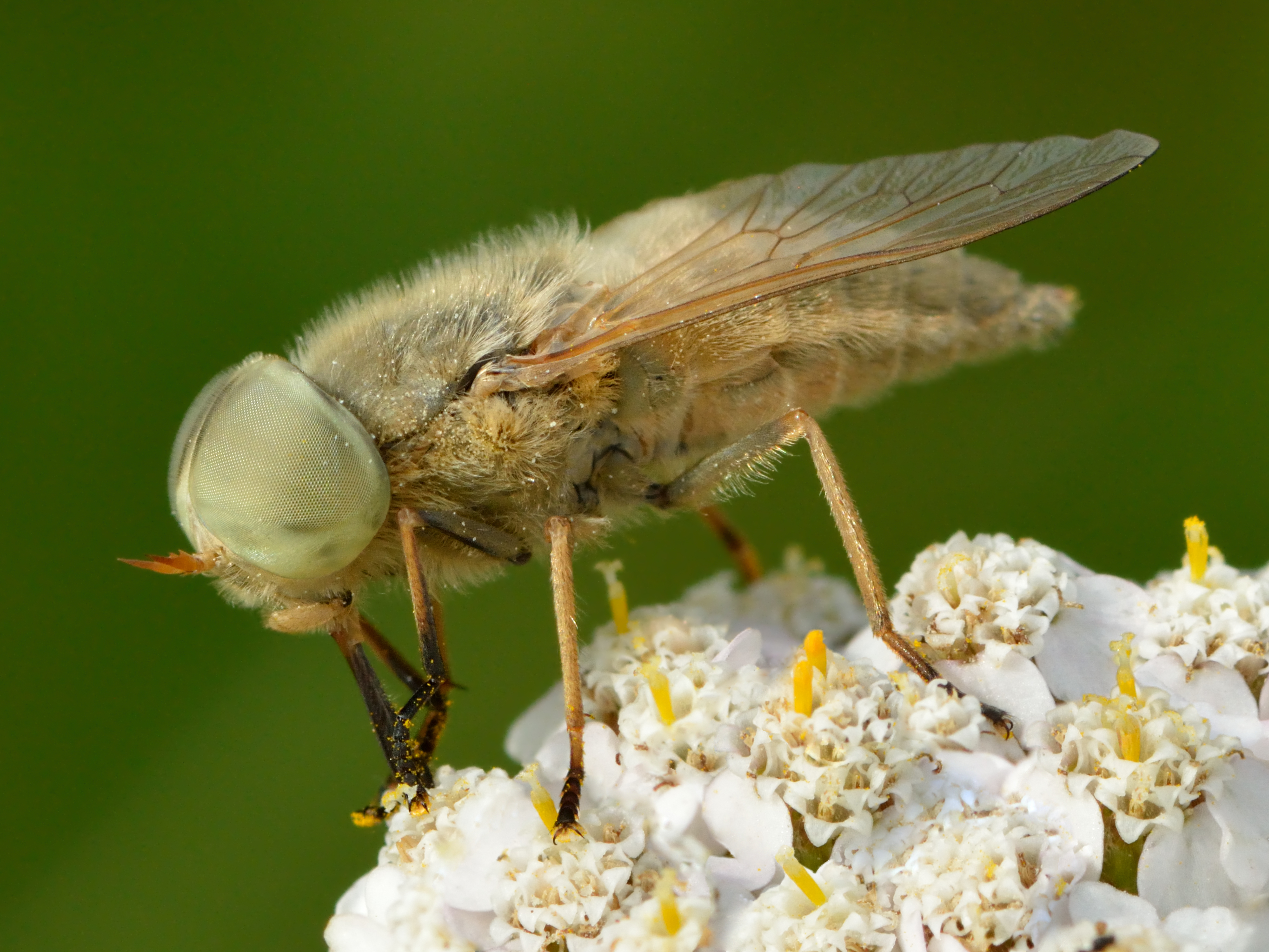
- ♂

Scientific classification
- Kingdom: Animalia
- Phylum: Arthropoda
- Class: Insecta
- Order: Diptera
- Family: Tabanidae
- Subfamily: Tabaninae
- Tribe: Tabanini
- Genus: Atylotus
- Species: A. rusticus

Binomial name
- Atylotus rusticus (Linnaeus, 1767)

Synonyms
- Tabanus rusticus Linnaeus, 1767; Tabanus ruralis Zetterstedt, 1838

= Atylotus rusticus =

Species of fly

Atylotus rusticus is a species of horse-flies in the genus Atylotus. It is found in Europe, Asia and North Africa.

Atylotus rusticus belongs to the group of insects known as Holometabola (holometabolising insects), which go through metamorphosis during their life. The larvae are radically different from the full-grown insects. Between the larval stage and the grown stage is a pupal stage, where the fly's inner and outer organs develop.
