= Hybomitra expollicata =

Scientific classification
- Kingdom: Animalia
- Phylum: Arthropoda
- Clade: Pancrustacea
- Class: Insecta
- Order: Diptera
- Family: Tabanidae
- Subfamily: Tabaninae
- Tribe: Tabanini
- Genus: Hybomitra
- Species: H. expollicata

Binomial name
- Hybomitra expollicata (Pandellé, 1883)

Synonyms
- Tabanus expollicata Pandellé, 1883; Hybomitra pseuderberi Philip & Aitken, 1958; Tabanus andreae Szilády, 1922; Tabanus nigrivitta Olsufiev, 1936

Species of fly

Hybomitra expollicata, also known as the striped horsefly, is a Palearctic species of horse fly in the family Tabanidae.
