= Hybomitra sequax =

Scientific classification
- Kingdom: Animalia
- Phylum: Arthropoda
- Clade: Pancrustacea
- Class: Insecta
- Order: Diptera
- Family: Tabanidae
- Subfamily: Tabaninae
- Tribe: Tabanini
- Genus: Hybomitra
- Species: H. sequax

Binomial name
- Hybomitra sequax (Williston, 1887)

Synonyms
- Tabanus sequax Williston, 1887; Tabanus fuscipalpis Bigot, 1892; Therioplectes leucophorus Bigot, 1892

Species of fly

Hybomitra sequax is a species of horse flies in the family Tabanidae.

== Distribution ==
Canada, United States
