= Poeciloderas =

Scientific classification
- Kingdom: Animalia
- Phylum: Arthropoda
- Class: Insecta
- Order: Diptera
- Family: Tabanidae
- Subfamily: Tabaninae
- Tribe: Tabanini
- Genus: Poeciloderas; Lutz, 1921

Type species
- Tabanus quadripunctatus Fabricius, 1805

Synonyms
- Poecilosoma Lutz, 1909; Poecilosoma Lutz, 1913; Poecilochlamys Lutz, 1922; Hybopelma Enderlein, 1922; Dasyphyrta Enderlein, 1922; Hypopelma Kröber, 1929; Poecilochlamys Borgmeier, 1933

Genus of flies

Poeciloderas is a genus of horse flies in the family Tabanidae.

== Species ==
- Poeciloderas allusiosis Wilkerson, 1979
- Poeciloderas caesiomaculatus (Kröber, 1931)
- Poeciloderas histrio (Wiedemann, 1830)
- Poeciloderas lindneri (Kröber, 1929)
- Poeciloderas lucipennis Kröber, 1934
- Poeciloderas ornatipennis (Kröber, 1934)
- Poeciloderas pampeanus Coscarón & Fairchild, 1976
- Poeciloderas quadripunctatus (Fabricius, 1805)
- Poeciloderas seclusus (Brèthes, 1910)
