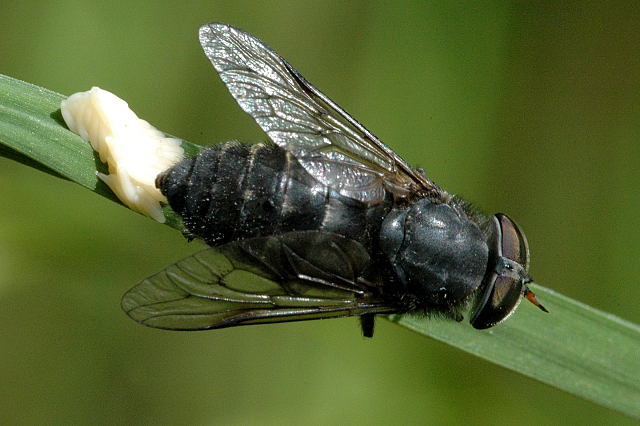
- Hybomitra micans female laying eggs

Scientific classification
- Kingdom: Animalia
- Phylum: Arthropoda
- Clade: Pancrustacea
- Class: Insecta
- Order: Diptera
- Family: Tabanidae
- Subfamily: Tabaninae
- Tribe: Tabanini
- Genus: Hybomitra
- Species: H. micans

Binomial name
- Hybomitra micans (Meigen, 1804)

Synonyms
- Tabanus micans Meigen, 1804; Tabanus nigra Donovan, 1813; Tabanus signata Wiedemann, 1820; Tabanus nigerrima Gravenhorst, 1807; Tabanus austriacus Fabricius, 1805

= Hybomitra micans =

Species of fly

Hybomitra micans is a species of horse flies in the family Tabanidae.

== Description ==
Diagnostic characters include: Females- Legs entirely black or brown; exceptionally, the tibias are a dark brown, never much lighter than the femurs.Palps thick, ending in a blunt tip . Antennae: third segment narrowed at the base. Frontal band with parallel or non-parallel edges. Frontal band with parallel edges Abdomen with entirely black or golden pubescence on the edges, without clear spots.-- L. 13–15 mm. Males-Legs entirely black;tarsus I with elongated, uneven bristles.

== Distribution ==
Europe.
