= Scomma =

Scientific classification
- Kingdom: Animalia
- Phylum: Arthropoda
- Class: Insecta
- Order: Diptera
- Family: Tachinidae
- Subfamily: Tachininae
- Tribe: Neaerini
- Genus: Scomma; Richter, 1972

Type species
- Scomma gobica Richter, 1972

Genus of flies

Scomma is a genus of flies in the family Tachinidae.

== Species ==
- Scomma gobica Richter, 1972

== Distribution ==
Mongolia
