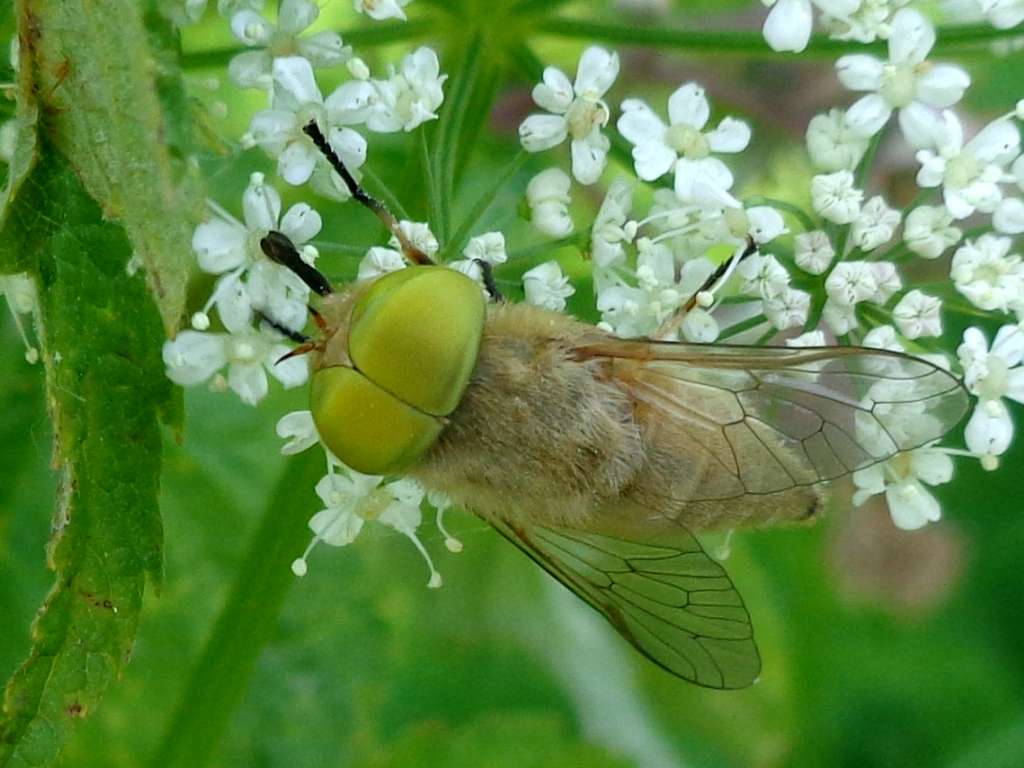
- Atylotus fulvus

Scientific classification
- Kingdom: Animalia
- Phylum: Arthropoda
- Clade: Pancrustacea
- Class: Insecta
- Order: Diptera
- Family: Tabanidae
- Subfamily: Tabaninae
- Tribe: Tabanini
- Genus: Atylotus; Osten-Sacken, 1876

Type species
- Tabanus bicolor Wiedemann, 1821

Synonyms
- Ochrops Szilády, 1915; Baikalia Surcouf, 1921; Dasystypia Enderlein, 1922; Surcoufiella Bequaert, 1924; Baikalomyia Stackelberg, 1926; Abatylotus Philip, 1948

= Atylotus =

Genus of flies

Atylotus is a genus of horse flies in the family Tabanidae, with records from Europe, Africa, mainland Asia and North America.

== Species ==
1. Atylotus adjacens (Ricardo, 1911)
2. Atylotus advena (Walker, 1850)
3. Atylotus aegyptiacus (Kröber, 1926)
4. Atylotus agrestis (Wiedemann, 1828)
5. Atylotus agricola (Wiedemann, 1828)
6. Atylotus albipalpus (Walker, 1850)
7. Atylotus albopruinosus (Szilády, 1923)
8. Atylotus angusticornis (Loew, 1858)
9. Atylotus austeni (Szilády, 1915)
10. Atylotus basicallus (Szilády, 1926)
11. Atylotus bicolor (Wiedemann, 1821)
12. Atylotus calcar Teskey, 1983
13. Atylotus canarius (Enderlein, 1929)
14. Atylotus chodukini (Olsufiev, 1952)
15. Atylotus cryptotaxis Burton, 1978
16. Atylotus deminutus Oldroyd, 1957
17. Atylotus diurnus (Walker, 1850)
18. Atylotus duplex (Walker, 1854)
19. Atylotus fairchildi Dias, 1984
20. Atylotus farinosus (Szilády, 1915)
21. Atylotus flavoguttatus (Szilády, 1915)
22. Atylotus fulvianus (Loew, 1858)
23. Atylotus fulvus (Meigen, 1804)
24. Atylotus hamoni Ovazza & Oldroyd, 1961
25. Atylotus hasegawai Hayakawa, 1978
26. Atylotus hendrixi Leclercq, 1966
27. Atylotus horvathi (Szilády, 1926)
28. Atylotus hyalicosta Teskey, 1985
29. Atylotus insuetus (Osten Sacken, 1877)
30. Atylotus intermedius (Walker, 1848)
31. Atylotus intermissus Tendeiro, 1969
32. Atylotus jianshei Sun & Xu, 2008
33. Atylotus juditeae Dias, 1991
34. Atylotus kakeromaensis Hayakawa, Takahasi & Suzuki, 1982
35. Atylotus keegani Murdoch & Takahasi, 1969
36. Atylotus kerteszi (Szilády, 1915)
37. Atylotus kroeberi (Surcouf, 1922)
38. Atylotus latistriatus Brauer, 1880
39. Atylotus leitonis Dias, 1966
40. Atylotus loewianus (Villeneuve, 1920)
41. Atylotus lotus Burton, 1978
42. Atylotus miser (Szilády, 1915)
43. Atylotus nagatomii Hayakawa, 1992
44. Atylotus negativus (Ricardo, 1911)
45. Atylotus nigromaculatus Ricardo, 1900
46. Atylotus ohioensis (Hine, 1901)
47. Atylotus olsufjevi Dias, 1984
48. Atylotus ovazzai Tendeiro, 1965
49. Atylotus ozensis Hayakawa, 1983
50. Atylotus pallitarsis (Olsufiev, 1936)
51. Atylotus palus Teskey, 1985
52. Atylotus plebeius (Fallén, 1817)
53. Atylotus proditor (Bogatchev & Samedov, 1949)
54. Atylotus pulchellus (Loew, 1858)
55. Atylotus quadrifarius (Loew, 1874)
56. Atylotus rusticus (Linnaeus, 1767)
57. Atylotus santosi Dias & Serrano, 1967
58. Atylotus sawadai Watanabe & Takahasi, 1971
59. Atylotus seurati (Surcouf, 1922)
60. Atylotus shagrensis El-Hassan, Badrawy, Fadi & Mohammad, 2019
61. Atylotus sinensis Szilády, 1926
62. Atylotus sphagnicola Teskey, 1985
63. Atylotus sublunaticornis (Zetterstedt, 1842)
64. Atylotus subvittatus Séguy, 1934
65. Atylotus sudharensis Kapoor, Grewal & Sharma, 1991
66. Atylotus suzukii Hayakawa, 1981
67. Atylotus takaraensis Hayakawa & Takahasi, 1983
68. Atylotus talyschensis Andreeva & Zeynalova, 2002
69. Atylotus tauffliebi Raymond, 1975
70. Atylotus theodori Abbassian-Lintzen, 1964
71. Atylotus thoracicus (Hine, 1900)
72. Atylotus tingaureus (Philip, 1936)
73. Atylotus utahensis (Rowe & Knowlton, 1935)
74. Atylotus vargasi Philip, 1954
75. Atylotus venturii Leclercq, 1967
76. Atylotus virgo (Wiedemann, 1824)
77. Atylotus woodi Pechuman, 1981
