= Montanarturia =

Scientific classification
- Kingdom: Animalia
- Phylum: Arthropoda
- Class: Insecta
- Order: Diptera
- Family: Tachinidae
- Subfamily: Tachininae
- Tribe: Neaerini
- Genus: Montanarturia; Miller, 1945

Type species
- Arthuria dimorpha Malloch, 1938

Synonyms
- Arthuria Malloch, 1938

Genus of flies

Montanarturia is a monotypic genus of flies in the family Tachinidae. Currently the genus includes a sole member, Montanarturia dimorpha, which is endemic to New Zealand.
