= Agkistrocerus =

Scientific classification
- Kingdom: Animalia
- Phylum: Arthropoda
- Class: Insecta
- Order: Diptera
- Family: Tabanidae
- Subfamily: Tabaninae
- Tribe: Tabanini
- Genus: Agkistrocerus; Philip, 1941

Type species
- Tabanus megerlei Wiedemann, 1828

Genus of flies

Agkistrocerus is a genus of horse flies in the family Tabanidae.

== Species ==
- Agkistrocerus aurantiacus (Bellardi, 1859)
- Agkistrocerus finitimus (Stone, 1938)
- Agkistrocerus megerlei (Wiedemann, 1828)
