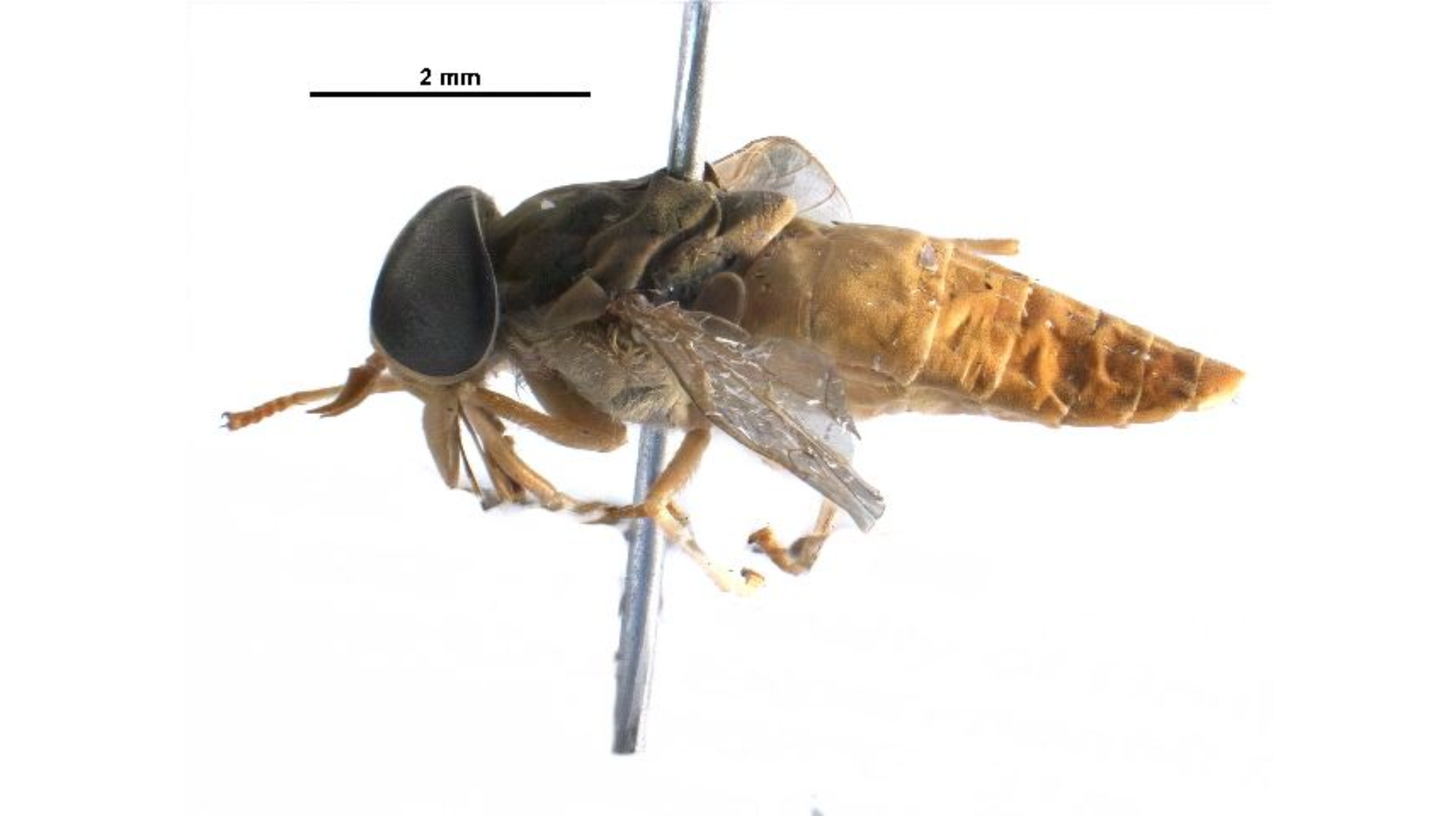

Scientific classification
- Domain: Eukaryota
- Kingdom: Animalia
- Phylum: Arthropoda
- Class: Insecta
- Order: Diptera
- Family: Tabanidae
- Genus: Atylotus
- Species: A. agrestis

Binomial name
- Atylotus agrestis (Wiedemann, 1828)

Synonyms
- Tabanus agrestis Wiedemann, 1828; Tabanus albicans Macquart, 1834; Tabanus bipunctatus Wulp, 1885; Tabanus ditoeniatus Macquart, 1838; Tabanus lacustris Ghidini, 1938; Tabanus pyrrhus Walker, 1850

= Atylotus agrestis =

Species of horse fly

Atylotus agrestis is a species of horse fly in the family Tabanidae.

== Distribution ==
Originally described as Tabanus agrestis in 1828 by Christian Rudolph Wilhelm Wiedemann from a series of specimens collected in Egypt. Widespread in Palearctic and Afrotropical realms. Presently widely distributed from Egypt and Cyprus westwards to Libya and Algeria, and eastwards through Saudi Arabia and Iraq to India, Sri Lanka, and China. In the last decades Atylotus agrestis continuously extended its distribution northwards: it recently became abundant in northeastern Algeria, from where it was absent in 1987, and since the late 1990’s it has been regularly recorded from the Sinai Peninsula, in Israel along the coastal plain and the Rift Valley, and a few years later it appeared in Lebanon and in Saudi Arabia. In Europe the species was first observed in Cyprus in 2015 and in the following years it was confirmed to be a stable element of the local fauna, the first record from Italy, the Pantelleria island, was confirmed in 2017.

== Blood feeding hosts and veterinary relevance ==
Known hosts in Europe and the Levant are horses, camels and men, in Africa—horses and cattle. In the Arabian Peninsula and Africa this species is an important vector for Trypanosoma parasites causing the disease called surra. Surra is a major disease in camels, equines, cattle and dogs, in which it can often be fatal.
