= Wattia =

Scientific classification
- Kingdom: Animalia
- Phylum: Arthropoda
- Class: Insecta
- Order: Diptera
- Family: Tachinidae
- Subfamily: Tachininae
- Tribe: Neaerini
- Genus: Wattia; Malloch, 1938

Type species
- Wattia ferruginea Malloch, 1938

Genus of flies

Wattia is a genus of flies in the family Tachinidae. Three species have been described, W. ferruginea, W. petiolata and W. sessilis. The species, now extinct was discovered by John Russell Malloch in 1938. It is classified in the subfamily Tachininae and in the family Tachinidae. The genus was originally found in New Zealand.

== Species ==
- Wattia ferruginea Malloch, 1938
- Wattia petiolata Malloch, 1938
- Wattia sessilis Malloch, 1938

== Distribution ==
The genus use to roam New Zealand before its extinction, mostly forested areas and either lakes and either areas with food sources, like fruit and carcasses, mostly dead animal matter.

== Diet ==
Like many other genuses in the family Tachinidae and Tachininae, its diet mainly consisted of either nuts and fruit, and in large groups feeding on dead animal carcasses before the genus' extinction in New Zealand. It may have also eaten dead birds, also with females laying eggs on dead carcasses.

== Characteristics ==
Like other fly genuses in the family Tachinidae and Tachininae, it may have been around the size of a house fly with male adults being larger than the female adults.
