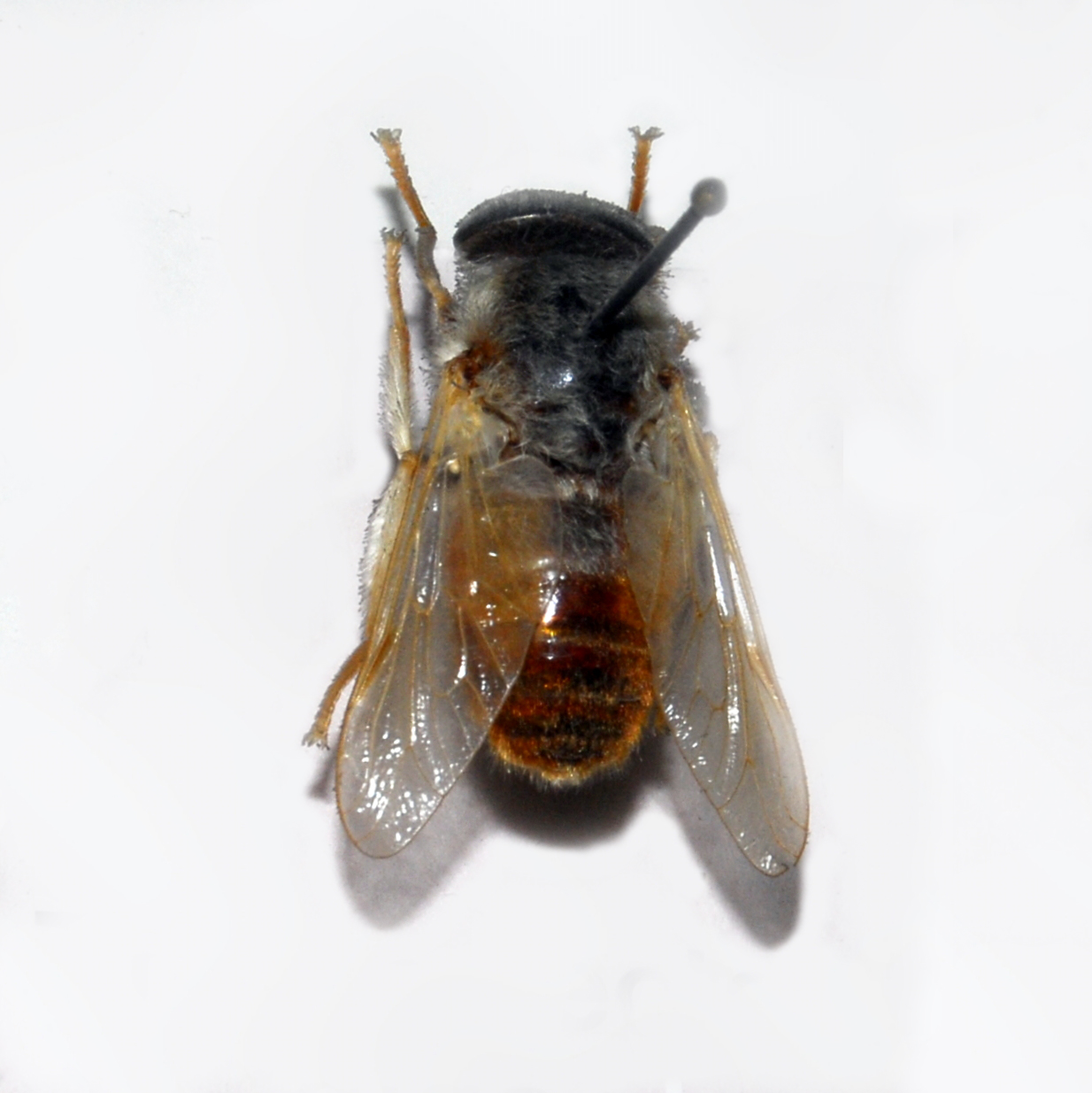
- Therioplectes gigas

Scientific classification
- Kingdom: Animalia
- Phylum: Arthropoda
- Class: Insecta
- Order: Diptera
- Family: Tabanidae
- Subfamily: Tabaninae
- Tribe: Tabanini
- Genus: Therioplectes; Zeller, 1842

Synonyms
- Brachytomus Costa, 1857; Brachystomus Coquillett, 1910; Sziladya Enderlein, 1923; Therioplectus Kröber, 1925

= Therioplectes =

Genus of insects

Therioplectes is a genus of horse fly in the family Tabanidae.

== Species ==
- Therioplectes albicauda Olsufiev, 1937
- Therioplectes canofasciatus (Austen, 1912)
- Therioplectes carabaghensis (Portschinsky, 1877)
- Therioplectes charopus (Lichtenstein, 1796)
- Therioplectes gigas (Herbst, 1787)
- Therioplectes griseus (Enderlein, 1925)
- Therioplectes hottentottus (Lichtenstein, 1796)
- Therioplectes kuehlhorni Moucha & Chvála, 1964
- Therioplectes ruwenzorii (Ricardo, 1908)
- Therioplectes tricolor Zeller, 1842
- Therioplectes tunicatus (Szilády, 1927)
- Therioplectes zumpti (Dias, 1956)
