= Calotachina =

Scientific classification
- Kingdom: Animalia
- Phylum: Arthropoda
- Class: Insecta
- Order: Diptera
- Family: Tachinidae
- Subfamily: Tachininae
- Tribe: Neaerini
- Genus: Calotachina; Malloch, 1938

Type species
- Calotachina tricolor Malloch, 1938

Genus of flies

Calotachina is a monotypic genus of flies in the family Tachinidae. The current sole member of the genus, Calotachina tricolor, is endemic to New Zealand.
