= Xenorhynchia =

Scientific classification
- Kingdom: Animalia
- Phylum: Arthropoda
- Class: Insecta
- Order: Diptera
- Family: Tachinidae
- Subfamily: Tachininae
- Tribe: Neaerini
- Genus: Xenorhynchia; Malloch, 1938

Type species
- Xenorhynchia peeli Malloch, 1938

Genus of flies

Xenorhynchia is a genus of flies in the family Tachinidae.

== Species ==
- Xenorhynchia orasus (Walker, 1849)
- Xenorhynchia peeli Malloch, 1938

== Distribution ==
New Zealand
