= Genotrichia =

Scientific classification
- Kingdom: Animalia
- Phylum: Arthropoda
- Class: Insecta
- Order: Diptera
- Family: Tachinidae
- Subfamily: Tachininae
- Tribe: Neaerini
- Genus: Genotrichia; Malloch, 1938

Type species
- Genotrichia tonnoiri Malloch, 1938

Genus of flies

Genotrichia is a genus of flies in the family Tachinidae.

== Species ==
- Genotrichia minor Malloch, 1938
- Genotrichia tonnoiri Malloch, 1938

== Distribution ==
New Zealand
