= Hamatabanus =

Scientific classification
- Kingdom: Animalia
- Phylum: Arthropoda
- Class: Insecta
- Order: Diptera
- Family: Tabanidae
- Subfamily: Tabaninae
- Tribe: Tabanini
- Genus: Hamatabanus; Philip, 1941

Type species
- Tabanus scitus Walker, 1848

Genus of flies

Hamatabanus is a genus of horse flies in the family Tabanidae.

== Species ==
- Hamatabanus annularis (Hine, 1917)
- Hamatabanus carolinensis (Macquart, 1838)
- Hamatabanus sexfasciatus (Stone, 1935)
