= Neoplectops =

Scientific classification
- Kingdom: Animalia
- Phylum: Arthropoda
- Class: Insecta
- Order: Diptera
- Family: Tachinidae
- Subfamily: Tachininae
- Tribe: Neaerini
- Genus: Neoplectops; Malloch, 1930

Type species
- Neoplectops nudibasis Malloch, 1930

Synonyms
- Craspedotricha Enderlein, 1936; Craspedotricha Herting & Dely-Draskovits, 1993; Pointelia Mesnil, 1956

Genus of flies

Neoplectops is a genus of flies in the family Tachinidae.

== Species ==
- Neoplectops nudibasis Malloch, 1930
- Neoplectops nudinerva (Mesnil, 1956)
- Neoplectops pomonellae (Schnabl & Mokrecki, 1903)
