= Microhystricia =

Scientific classification
- Kingdom: Animalia
- Phylum: Arthropoda
- Class: Insecta
- Order: Diptera
- Family: Tachinidae
- Subfamily: Tachininae
- Tribe: Neaerini
- Genus: Microhystricia; Malloch, 1938

Type species
- Microhystricia gourlayi Malloch, 1938

Genus of flies

Microhystricia is a monotypic genus of flies in the family Tachinidae. The current sole member, Microhystricia gourlayi, is endemic to New Zealand.

== Distribution ==
New Zealand
