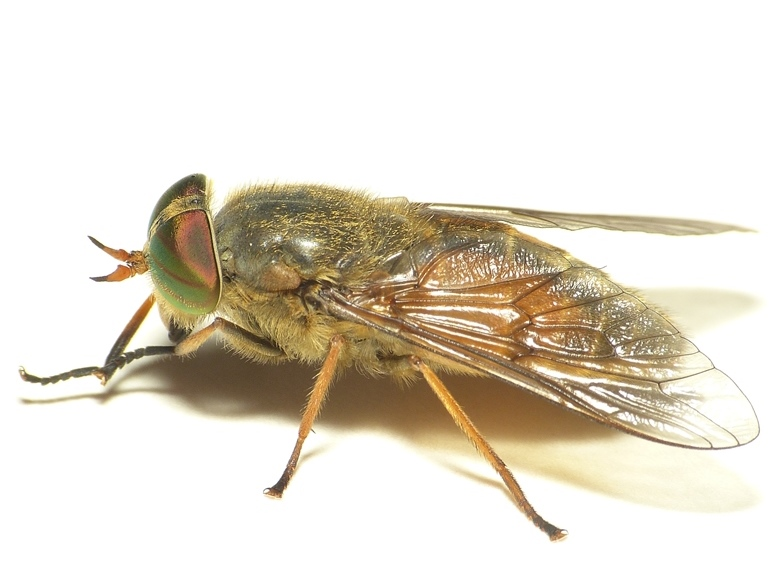
- Hybomitra ciureai the Netherlands

Scientific classification
- Kingdom: Animalia
- Phylum: Arthropoda
- Clade: Pancrustacea
- Class: Insecta
- Order: Diptera
- Family: Tabanidae
- Subfamily: Tabaninae
- Tribe: Tabanini
- Genus: Hybomitra
- Species: H. ciureai

Binomial name
- Hybomitra ciureai (Séguy, 1937)

Synonyms
- Sziladynus ciureai Séguy, 1937; Hybomitra solstitialis authors, misident.; Hybomitra schineri Lyneborg, 1959

= Hybomitra ciureai =

Species of fly

Hybomitra ciureai is a Palearctic species of horse fly in the family Tabanidae. Continental authorities apply the name solstitialis to the coastal species Hybomitra ciureai of British authorities and regard British solstitialis as var. collini of Hybomitra bimaculata.
