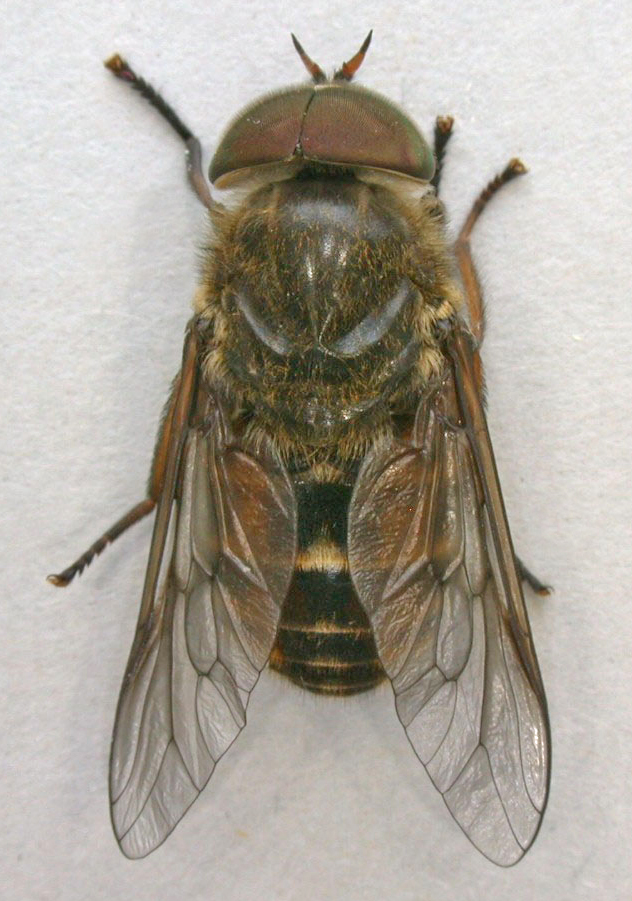
- Hybomitra bimaculata Trawsgoed, North Wales

Scientific classification
- Kingdom: Animalia
- Phylum: Arthropoda
- Clade: Pancrustacea
- Class: Insecta
- Order: Diptera
- Family: Tabanidae
- Subfamily: Tabaninae
- Tribe: Tabanini
- Genus: Hybomitra
- Species: H. bimaculata

Binomial name
- Hybomitra bimaculata (Macquart, 1826)

Synonyms
- Hybomitra collini Lyneborg, 1959; Tabanus solstitialis ssp. manchuricus Takagi, 1941; Therioplectes subguttatus Enderlein, 1925; Tabanus bisignatus Jaennicke, 1866; Tabanus confinis Zetterstedt, 1838

= Hybomitra bimaculata =

Species of fly

Hybomitra bimaculata is a Palearctic species of horse fly in the family Tabanidae. It belongs to a difficult species complex of several similar clades that were previously divided into several species. It has been shown to be synonymous with Hybomitra collini, which has prominent, large orange lateral spots on the first three or four segments of the thorax, forming a strong dark midline. Another is Hybomitra bisignata, with a dark thorax and narrow yellow stripes on each segment of the thorax. Hybomitra bisignata and Hybomitra collini are now considered subspecies.

== Distribution ==
Europe, Russia, Mongolia, China, Japan.
