= Neaerini =

Scientific classification
- Kingdom: Animalia
- Phylum: Arthropoda
- Class: Insecta
- Order: Diptera
- Family: Tachinidae
- Subfamily: Tachininae
- Tribe: Neaerini

Tribe of flies

Neaerini is a tribe of flies in the family Tachinidae.

== Genera ==
- Calotachina Malloch, 1938
- Genotrichia Malloch, 1938
- Microhystricia Malloch, 1938
- Montanarturia Miller, 1945
- Neaera Robineau-Desvoidy, 1830
- Neoplectops Malloch, 1930
- Scomma Richter, 1972
- Wattia Malloch, 1938
- Xenorhynchia Malloch, 1938
