= James Francis McAlpine =

Canadian entomologist (1922–2019)

James Francis (Frank) McAlpine (25 September 1922 – 3 December 2019) was a Canadian entomologist specialising in Diptera.
