= Émile Joseph Isidore Gobert =

French entomologist (1838–1923)

Émile Joseph Isidore Gobert (22 June 1838 – 11 April 1923) was a French entomologist who specialised in Coleoptera and Diptera. He was made a Knight of the Legion of Honour in 1891.

== Selected works ==
- Gobert, Émile (1880) [1872]. Catalogue raisonné des insectes coléoptères des Landes [Annotated catalogue of the Coleoptera of Landes]. Toulouse: s.n.
- Gobert, Émile (1887). "Catalogue des diptères de France" [Catalogue of the Diptera of France]. Revue d'entomologie. 6. Société française d'entomologie.
