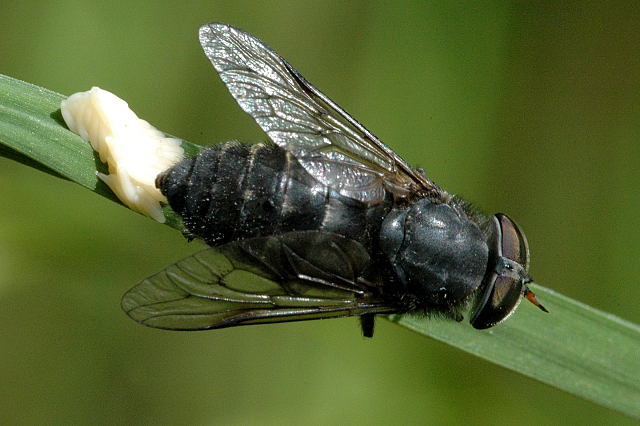
- Hybomitra micans female laying eggs

Scientific classification
- Kingdom: Animalia
- Phylum: Arthropoda
- Clade: Pancrustacea
- Class: Insecta
- Order: Diptera
- Family: Tabanidae
- Tribe: Tabanini
- Genus: Hybomitra; Enderlein, 1922

Synonyms
- Sziladynus Enderlein, 1922; Therioplectes Verrall, 1909

= Hybomitra =

Genus of flies

Hybomitra is a genus of horse flies in the family Tabanidae. There are at least 240 described species in Hybomitra.

== See also ==
- List of Hybomitra species
