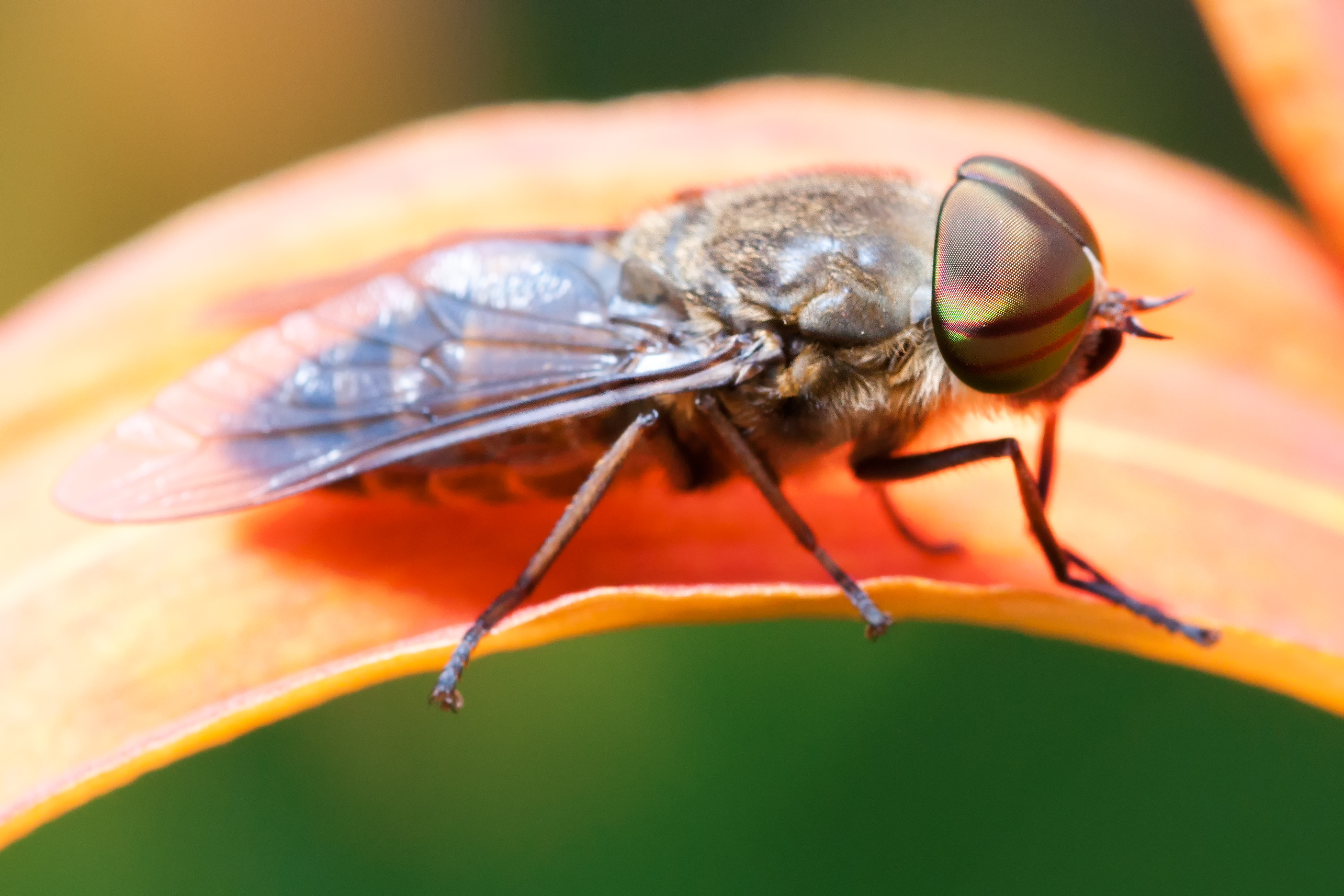
- Tabanus bovinus

Scientific classification
- Domain: Eukaryota
- Kingdom: Animalia
- Phylum: Arthropoda
- Class: Insecta
- Order: Diptera
- Family: Tabanidae
- Subfamily: Tabaninae
- Tribe: Tabanini; Enderlein, 1922

= Tabanini =

Tribe of flies

Tabanini is a tribe of horse and deer flies in the family Tabanidae. There are at least 220 described species in Tabanini.

== Genera ==
- Agkistrocerus Philip, 1941
- Ancala Enderlein, 1922
- Atylotus Osten Sacken, 1876
- Dasyrhamphis Enderlein, 1922
- Hamatabanus Philip, 1941
- Hybomitra Enderlein, 1922
- Poeciloderas Lutz, 1921
- Tabanus Linnaeus, 1758
- Therioplectes Zeller, 1842
- Whitneyomyia Bequaert, 1933
