= List of Tabanus species =

List of different species of Tabanus, a type of horsefly

This is a list of 1358 species in Tabanus, a genus of horseflies in the family Tabanidae.

== Tabanus species ==
=== A ===
- Tabanus aaptus Fairchild, 1985
- Tabanus aar Philip, 1941
- Tabanus abactor Philip, 1936
- Tabanus abaculus Philip, 1960
- Tabanus abauristriatus Philip, 1960
- Tabanus abbasalis Philip, 1960
- Tabanus abbreviatus (Bigot, 1892)
- Tabanus abditus Philip, 1941
- Tabanus abdominalis Fabricius, 1805
- Tabanus abjanensis Ježek, Tkoc & Harten, 2017
- Tabanus abscondens Walker, 1860
- Tabanus acallosus Philip, 1961
- Tabanus acallus Szilády, 1926
- Tabanus accensus Austen, 1920
- Tabanus accipiter Szilády, 1923
- Tabanus acer Brèthes, 1910
- Tabanus acuminaris Philip, 1960
- Tabanus acutus (Bigot, 1892)
- Tabanus adhabarensis Matsumura & Takahasi, 1976
- Tabanus adiastolus Fairchild, 1986
- Tabanus admelanopygus Philip, 1974
- Tabanus administrans Schiner, 1868
- Tabanus aegrotus Osten Sacken, 1877
- Tabanus aeneus Surcouf, 1907
- Tabanus agnoscibilis Austen, 1922
- Tabanus aidini Kröber, 1928
- Tabanus alatocinereus Dias, 1974
- Tabanus albicinctus Schuurmans Stekhoven, 1926
- Tabanus albicuspis Wang, 1985
- Tabanus albifacies Loew, 1856
- Tabanus albifrons Szilády, 1914
- Tabanus albilinea Walker, 1848
- Tabanus albitibialis Macquart, 1838
- Tabanus albitriangularis Schuurmans Stekhoven, 1926
- Tabanus albocirculus Hine, 1907
- Tabanus albocostatus (Bigot, 1892)
- Tabanus albocreus Philip, 1974
- Tabanus albofasciatus Ricardo, 1911
- Tabanus albopunctatus Schuurmans Stekhoven, 1926
- Tabanus albosetosus Coher, 1985
- Tabanus algeriensis Peus, 1980
- Tabanus altermaculatus Ricardo, 1913
- Tabanus alticola Philip, 1959
- Tabanus alumnus Burton, 1978
- Tabanus alvarengai Schacht, 1987
- Tabanus amaenus Walker, 1848
- Tabanus amamiensis Hayakawa, Suzuki & Nagashima, 1981
- Tabanus amapaensis Fairchild, 1961
- Tabanus americanus Forster, 1771
- Tabanus amoenatus Séguy, 1934
- Tabanus anabates Philip, 1960
- Tabanus anatolicus Olsufiev, Moucha & Chvála, 1967
- Tabanus andamanensis Kapoor, Grewal & Sharma, 1991
- Tabanus andamanicus (Bigot, 1892)
- Tabanus anderssoni Philip, 1972
- Tabanus angustilimbatus Senior-White, 1924
- Tabanus angustipalpis Schuurmans Stekhoven, 1926
- Tabanus angustistriatus Schuurmans Stekhoven, 1926
- Tabanus angustitriangularis Schuurmans Stekhoven, 1926
- Tabanus angustiventer Schuurmans Stekhoven, 1926
- Tabanus angustofrons Wang, 1985
- Tabanus angustus Macquart, 1838
- Tabanus aniptus Fairchild, 1976
- Tabanus annamensis Philip, 1960
- Tabanus annamiticus Surcouf, 1911
- Tabanus annamitus (Bigot, 1892)
- Tabanus anomalus Philip, 1959
- Tabanus ansarii Abbassian-Lintzen, 1960
- Tabanus antarcticus Linnaeus, 1758
- Tabanus antennarum (Kröber, 1936)
- Tabanus anthrax Olsufiev, 1937
- Tabanus antunesi Fairchild, 1985
- Tabanus apicalis Wiedemann, 1828
- Tabanus approximatus Oldroyd, 1949
- Tabanus aquilus Surcouf, 1907
- Tabanus arabicus Macquart, 1839
- Tabanus aranti Hays, 1961
- Tabanus arctus Wang, 1982
- Tabanus ardalus Philip, 1960
- Tabanus ardens Wiedemann, 1821
- Tabanus arenicolor Peus, 1980
- Tabanus arenivagus Austen, 1920
- Tabanus arfaai Abbassian-Lintzen, 1966
- Tabanus argentatus (Szilády, 1926)
- Tabanus argenteomaculatus (Kröber, 1928)
- Tabanus argenteus Surcouf, 1907
- Tabanus argentifrons Walker, 1848
- Tabanus argentisignatus Schuurmans Stekhoven, 1926
- Tabanus argentivittatus Fairchild, 1976
- Tabanus arisanus Shiraki, 1918
- Tabanus armeniacus (Kröber, 1928)
- Tabanus armenicus Szilády, 1926
- Tabanus arnaudi Philip, 1978
- Tabanus atamuradovi Dolin & Andreeva, 1986
- Tabanus atratoides Burger, 1988
- Tabanus atratus Fabricius, 1775
- Tabanus atrimaculatus Schuurmans Stekhoven, 1932
- Tabanus atrimanus Loew, 1858
- Tabanus atripilosus Schuurmans Stekhoven, 1926
- Tabanus atripunctatus Schuurmans Stekhoven, 1926
- Tabanus atrisignatus Schuurmans Stekhoven, 1926
- Tabanus atristylatus Burger, 1988
- Tabanus atriventer Schuurmans Stekhoven, 1926
- Tabanus atrohirtus Ricardo, 1911
- Tabanus atropathenicus Olsufiev, 1937
- Tabanus atropilosus Burger, 1988
- Tabanus attenuatus Walker, 1848
- Tabanus attenuis Philip, 1959
- Tabanus aublanti Toumanoff, 1953
- Tabanus audyi Philip, 1960
- Tabanus aurantium Philip, 1957
- Tabanus aurepiloides Xu & Deng, 1990
- Tabanus auribundus Schuurmans Stekhoven, 1926
- Tabanus auricauda Philip, 1956
- Tabanus auricingulatus Schuurmans Stekhoven, 1926
- Tabanus auricircus Philip, 1979
- Tabanus aurifer Schuurmans Stekhoven, 1926
- Tabanus auriflamma Walker, 1848
- Tabanus aurilineatus Schuurmans Stekhoven, 1926
- Tabanus auripilosus Philip, 1959
- Tabanus auripunctatus Macquart, 1839
- Tabanus aurisegmentatus Schuurmans Stekhoven, 1932
- Tabanus aurisetosus Toumanoff, 1950
- Tabanus aurisparsus Schuurmans Stekhoven, 1926
- Tabanus auristriatus Ricardo, 1911
- Tabanus auriventer Schuurmans Stekhoven, 1926
- Tabanus aurivittatus Ricardo, 1913
- Tabanus aurora Macquart, 1838
- Tabanus aurotestaceus Walker, 1854
- Tabanus australicus Taylor, 1919
- Tabanus autumnalis Linnaeus, 1761
- Tabanus avittatus Schuurmans Stekhoven, 1926

=== B ===
- Tabanus bactrianus Olsufiev, 1937
- Tabanus baguiensis Philip, 1959
- Tabanus bakeri Philip, 1959
- Tabanus balabacensis Chvála & Lyneborg, 1970
- Tabanus ballmeri Burton, 1978
- Tabanus baohaii Xu & Liu, 1980
- Tabanus baohaii Xu & Sun, 2008
- Tabanus baojiensis Xu & Liu, 1980
- Tabanus barbarus Coquebert, 1804
- Tabanus barbatus Thunberg, 1789
- Tabanus barclayi Austen, 1912
- Tabanus barnesi Austen, 1922
- Tabanus basalis Macquart, 1838
- Tabanus bashiri Abro, 1994
- Tabanus basilaris Kröber, 1931
- Tabanus beneficus Wang, 1982
- Tabanus bequaertianus Fain, 1949
- Tabanus beshkentica Baratov, 1980
- Tabanus besti Surcouf, 1907
- Tabanus besti var. arbucklei Austen, 1912
- Tabanus bewanensis Oldroyd, 1964
- Tabanus biannularis Philip, 1960
- Tabanus biatripunctatus Schuurmans Stekhoven, 1926
- Tabanus bicoloratus Philip, 1962
- Tabanus bifarius Loew, 1858
- Tabanus bifloccus Hine, 1925
- Tabanus bigoti Bellardi, 1859
- Tabanus biguttatus Wiedemann, 1830 (hippo fly)
- Tabanus bilateralis Schuurmans Stekhoven, 1926
- Tabanus billingtoni Newstead, Dutton & Todd, 1907
- Tabanus bilorus Oldroyd, 1963
- Tabanus bimini Philip, 1957
- Tabanus birdiei Whitney, 1914
- Tabanus birmanicus (Bigot, 1892)
- Tabanus bishoppi Stone, 1933
- Tabanus bivari Dias, 1985
- Tabanus boharti Philip, 1950
- Tabanus bombyaensis Schuurmans Stekhoven, 1926
- Tabanus borealoriens Burton, 1978
- Tabanus boueti Surcouf, 1907
- Tabanus bovinus Linnaeus, 1758
- Tabanus brancoi Dias, 1989
- Tabanus brassofortei Dias, 1980
- Tabanus brevicallus Philip, 1959
- Tabanus brevifrons Kröber, 1931
- Tabanus brevitrianguliferus Kröber, 1931
- Tabanus briani Leclercq, 1962
- Tabanus brincki Philip, 1973
- Tabanus brochei Cruz & García, 1974
- Tabanus brodeni Bequaert, 1913
- Tabanus bromiolus Szilády, 1923
- Tabanus bromius Linnaeus, 1758
- Tabanus bromius var. flavofemoratus Strobl, 1909
- Tabanus brumpti Surcouf, 1907
- Tabanus brunneicollis Hine & Bequaert, 1932
- Tabanus brunneocallosus Olsufiev, 1936
- Tabanus brunneothorax Schuurmans Stekhoven, 1924
- Tabanus brunneus Thunberg, 1827
- Tabanus brunnipennis Ricardo, 1911
- Tabanus brunnipes Schuurmans Stekhoven, 1926
- Tabanus brunniventer Schuurmans Stekhoven, 1926
- Tabanus bubali Doleschall, 1856
- Tabanus bubalophilus Schuurmans Stekhoven, 1926
- Tabanus bubbermani Nieschulz, 1927
- Tabanus bucolicus Schiner, 1868
- Tabanus budda Portschinsky, 1887
- Tabanus budongoensis Crosskey, 1965
- Tabanus burgeri (Philip, 1978)
- Tabanus burmanensis Schuurmans Stekhoven, 1926

=== C ===
- Tabanus caduceus Burton, 1978
- Tabanus caenosus Burger, 1974
- Tabanus caerulescens Macquart, 1838
- Tabanus calabyi Mackerras, 1971
- Tabanus calcarius Xu & Liao, 1984
- Tabanus calens Linnaeus, 1758
- Tabanus calidus Walker, 1850
- Tabanus caligneus Philip, 1974
- Tabanus callogaster Wang, 1988
- Tabanus cambodianus Philip, 1960
- Tabanus cambodiensis Toumanoff, 1953
- Tabanus camelarius Austen, 1911
- Tabanus campechianus Townsend, 1897
- Tabanus campestris Brèthes, 1910
- Tabanus candidus Ricardo, 1913
- Tabanus canipalpis (Bigot, 1892)
- Tabanus canipus Schuurmans Stekhoven, 1926
- Tabanus canus Karsch, 1879
- Tabanus capelai Dias, 1992
- Tabanus catenatus Walker, 1848
- Tabanus caucasius Kröber, 1925
- Tabanus cayensis Fairchild, 1935
- Tabanus cazieri Philip, 1954
- Tabanus cementus Xu & Liao, 1984
- Tabanus centroafricanus Dias, 1996
- Tabanus cepuricus Surcouf, 1922
- Tabanus cervinus Kröber, 1929
- Tabanus ceylonicus Schiner, 1868
- Tabanus chalcothrix Fairchild, 1961
- Tabanus charrua Coscarón, 1980
- Tabanus chekiangensis Ôuchi, 1943
- Tabanus cheliopterus Rondani, 1850
- Tabanus chenfui Xu & Sun, 2013
- Tabanus chentangensis Zhu & Xu, 1995
- Tabanus chicoi Tendeiro, 1965
- Tabanus chinensis Ôuchi, 1943
- Tabanus chloropsis Schuurmans Stekhoven, 1926
- Tabanus choiseulensis Mackerras, 1972
- Tabanus chosenensis Murdoch & Takahasi, 1969
- Tabanus choumarae Leclercq, 1967
- Tabanus christophi Kröber, 1928
- Tabanus chrysogaster Schuurmans Stekhoven, 1926
- Tabanus chrysoleucus Walker, 1854
- Tabanus chrysurinus (Enderlein, 1925)
- Tabanus chrysurus Loew, 1858
- Tabanus cincta Fabricius, 1794
- Tabanus cinerescens Macleay, 1826
- Tabanus cingulatus Thunberg, 1827
- Tabanus cinnamoneus Doleschall, 1858
- Tabanus circumalbatus Schuurmans Stekhoven, 1932
- Tabanus citripilosus Schuurmans Stekhoven, 1926
- Tabanus claripennis (Bigot, 1892)
- Tabanus claritibialis Ricardo, 1908
- Tabanus clenchi Bequaert, 1940
- Tabanus cnemidotus Philip, 1959
- Tabanus cneus Philip, 1974
- Tabanus coarctatus Stone, 1935
- Tabanus cohaerens Walker, 1865
- Tabanus colombensis Macquart, 1846
- Tabanus columbus Fairchild, 1942
- Tabanus combustus (Bigot, 1891)
- Tabanus comitans Wiedemann, 1828
- Tabanus commixtus Walker, 1860
- Tabanus comosus Stone, 1944
- Tabanus concolor Walker, 1848
- Tabanus concurrens Walker, 1858
- Tabanus conformis Walker, 1848
- Tabanus confusiens Philip, 1959
- Tabanus congoicola Bequaert, 1930
- Tabanus congoiensis Ricardo, 1908
- Tabanus conicus (Bigot, 1892)
- Tabanus coniformis Ricardo, 1908
- Tabanus coninckae Dias, 1993
- Tabanus conius Philip, 1959
- Tabanus consanguineus Macquart, 1838
- Tabanus conspicuus Ricardo, 1908
- Tabanus conterminus Walker, 1850
- Tabanus copemani Austen, 1912
- Tabanus corax Loew, 1863
- Tabanus cordiger Meigen & Wiedemann, 1820
- Tabanus cordigeroides Surcouf, 1923
- Tabanus coreanus Shiraki, 1932
- Tabanus corone Osten Sacken, 1886
- Tabanus corpulentus Brèthes, 1910
- Tabanus craverii Bellardi, 1859
- Tabanus crocitinctipennis Schuurmans Stekhoven, 1926
- Tabanus crocodilinus Austen, 1912
- Tabanus crosskeyi Tendeiro, 1965
- Tabanus cruzesilvai Dias, 1980
- Tabanus cubensis Cruz & García, 1974
- Tabanus cuculus Szilády, 1923
- Tabanus cuisancei Dias, 1996
- Tabanus curticornis Kröber, 1931
- Tabanus curtus Hine, 1920
- Tabanus cyclops Szilády, 1926
- Tabanus cyclopus Philip, 1961
- Tabanus cylindricallosus Schuurmans Stekhoven, 1926
- Tabanus cylindrocallus Wang, 1988
- Tabanus cymatophorus Osten Sacken, 1876

=== D-E ===
- Tabanus daedalus (Stone, 1938)
- Tabanus daishojii Murdoch & Takahasi, 1969
- Tabanus daohaoi Xu, 2005
- Tabanus darimonti Leclercq, 1964
- Tabanus darlingtoni Bequaert, 1940
- Tabanus davidsoni Taylor, 1919
- Tabanus decipiens (Kröber, 1928)
- Tabanus decoratus Szilády, 1926
- Tabanus defilippii Bellardi, 1859
- Tabanus demellonis Senior-White, 1924
- Tabanus denshamii Austen, 1908
- Tabanus denticulatus Ricardo, 1913
- Tabanus destructus Szilády, 1926
- Tabanus dietrichi Pechuman, 1956
- Tabanus discifer Walker, 1850
- Tabanus discors Burton, 1978
- Tabanus discrepans Ricardo, 1911
- Tabanus discus Wiedemann, 1828
- Tabanus dissimilis Ricardo, 1911
- Tabanus distinctus Ricardo, 1908
- Tabanus diversifrons Ricardo, 1911
- Tabanus diversus Ricardo, 1908
- Tabanus divulsus Suh, Choi & Kwon, 2003
- Tabanus dolini Ivanishchuk, 1986
- Tabanus dominicanus Kröber, 1931
- Tabanus dominus Datta & Das, 1978
- Tabanus donaldsoni Carter, 1912
- Tabanus doreicus Walker, 1861
- Tabanus dorsifer Walker, 1860
- Tabanus dorsifloccus Szilády, 1926
- Tabanus dorsiger Wiedemann, 1821
- Tabanus dorsivitta Walker, 1850
- Tabanus dorsobimaculatus Macquart, 1850
- Tabanus dorsomaculatus Macquart, 1847
- Tabanus dorsonotatus Macquart, 1847
- Tabanus duckei Fairchild, 1985
- Tabanus dunni Fairchild, 1942
- Tabanus dzhafarovi Khudaverdiev & Dzhafarov, 1974
- Tabanus eadsi Philip, 1962
- Tabanus effilatanus Philip, 1959
- Tabanus effilatus Schuurmans Stekhoven, 1926
- Tabanus eggeri var. prometheus Szilády, 1923
- Tabanus ekor Al-Talafha, Yaakop & Idris, 2017
- Tabanus eldridgei Fairchild, 1973
- Tabanus elongatus Wiedemann, 1828
- Tabanus enanus Fairchild, 1942
- Tabanus endymion Osten Sacken, 1878
- Tabanus equicinctus Schuurmans Stekhoven, 1926
- Tabanus erebus Osten Sacken, 1886
- Tabanus erythraeus (Bigot, 1892)
- Tabanus euphanes Surcouf, 1922
- Tabanus eurycerus Philip, 1937
- Tabanus eurytopus Burton, 1978
- Tabanus exagens Walker, 1864
- Tabanus excelsus Ricardo, 1913
- Tabanus exclusus Pandellé, 1883
- Tabanus exilipalpis Stone, 1938
- Tabanus exoticus Ricardo, 1913
- Tabanus explicatus Walker, 1854
- Tabanus expulsus Walker, 1854
- Tabanus extricans Walker, 1861

=== F-G ===
- Tabanus factiosus Walker, 1859
- Tabanus faini Oldroyd, 1954
- Tabanus fairchildi Stone, 1938
- Tabanus falviscutellus Philip, 1962
- Tabanus fascius Philip, 1960
- Tabanus felderi Wulp, 1885
- Tabanus femoralis Kröber, 1931
- Tabanus fijianus Ricardo, 1914
- Tabanus filipjevi Olsufiev, 1936
- Tabanus firmus Burton, 1978
- Tabanus flammeus Schuurmans Stekhoven, 1926
- Tabanus flaviannulatus Schuurmans Stekhoven, 1932
- Tabanus flavicapitis Wang & Liu, 1977
- Tabanus flavicornis Schuurmans Stekhoven, 1926
- Tabanus flavicoxa Oldroyd, 1954
- Tabanus flavimarginatus Schuurmans Stekhoven, 1926
- Tabanus flavimedius Schuurmans Stekhoven, 1926
- Tabanus flavioculatus Toumanoff, 1950
- Tabanus flavipennis Ricardo, 1913
- Tabanus flavipilosus Schuurmans Stekhoven, 1926
- Tabanus flavipus Schuurmans Stekhoven, 1926
- Tabanus flaviscutellatus Schuurmans Stekhoven, 1926
- Tabanus flaviscutellus Philip, 1962
- Tabanus flavissimus Ricardo, 1911
- Tabanus flavistriatus Schuurmans Stekhoven, 1926
- Tabanus flavitibiatus Schuurmans Stekhoven, 1926
- Tabanus flavitriangularis Schuurmans Stekhoven, 1926
- Tabanus flavivittatus Schuurmans Stekhoven, 1926
- Tabanus flavohirtus Philip, 1960
- Tabanus flavothorax Ricardo, 1911
- Tabanus flexilis Walker, 1859
- Tabanus flocculus Bequaert, 1940
- Tabanus fontinalis Schuurmans Stekhoven, 1926
- Tabanus formosiensis Ricardo, 1911
- Tabanus fortis Fairchild, 1961
- Tabanus fossilis Grabenhorst, 1985
- Tabanus fragai Dias, 1955
- Tabanus fraseri Austen, 1925
- Tabanus fratellus Williston, 1887
- Tabanus fraternus Macquart, 1846
- Tabanus fronto Osten Sacken, 1876
- Tabanus fujianensis Xu & Xu, 1993
- Tabanus fullo Walker, 1850
- Tabanus fulvicallus Philip, 1931
- Tabanus fulvicapillus Carter, 1912
- Tabanus fulvicinctus Ricardo, 1914
- Tabanus fulvilinearis Philip, 1960
- Tabanus fulvilineis Philip, 1957
- Tabanus fulvilineus Hayakawa & Takahasi, 1983
- Tabanus fulvimedioides Shiraki, 1918
- Tabanus fulvissimus Rondani, 1875
- Tabanus fulvulus Wiedemann, 1828
- Tabanus fulvulus var. pallidescens Philip, 1936
- Tabanus fumidus Austen, 1923
- Tabanus fumifer Walker, 1856
- Tabanus fumipennis Wiedemann, 1828
- Tabanus fumomarginatus Hine, 1920
- Tabanus funebris Macquart, 1846
- Tabanus furunculigenus Doleschall, 1858
- Tabanus furunculus Williston, 1901
- Tabanus furvicaudus Xu, 1981
- Tabanus fuscibarbus Schuurmans Stekhoven, 1926
- Tabanus fuscicauda (Bigot, 1892)
- Tabanus fuscicornis Ricardo, 1911
- Tabanus fuscicostatus Hine, 1906
- Tabanus fuscifrons Schuurmans Stekhoven, 1926
- Tabanus fuscipleuris Oldroyd, 1954
- Tabanus fuscithorax Schuurmans Stekhoven, 1926
- Tabanus fusciventer Schuurmans Stekhoven, 1926
- Tabanus fuscofasciatus Macquart, 1838
- Tabanus fuscomaculatus Ricardo, 1911
- Tabanus fuscomaculatus var. unisignatus Szilády, 1926
- Tabanus fuscomarginatus Ricardo, 1908
- Tabanus fusconervosus Macquart, 1838
- Tabanus fuscopunctatus Macquart, 1850
- Tabanus fuscotibialis Elsen, 1989
- Tabanus fuscoventris Xu, 1981
- Tabanus fuscus Wiedemann, 1819
- Tabanus fuzhouensis Xu & Xu, 1995
- Tabanus fuzouensis Xu & Xu, 1995
- Tabanus galloisi Kono & Takahasi, 1939
- Tabanus geminus Szilády, 1923
- Tabanus geniculatus Wulp, 1881
- Tabanus geographicus Burton, 1978
- Tabanus gibensis Turnbull, Taylor & Smith, 1992
- Tabanus gilanus Townsend, 1897
- Tabanus gilingilensis Mackerras, 1962
- Tabanus gilvellus Philip, 1960
- Tabanus gilvilineis Philip, 1960
- Tabanus gilvus Schuurmans Stekhoven, 1926
- Tabanus gladiator Stone, 1935
- Tabanus glaucomaculis Philip, 1978
- Tabanus glauconotatus Philip, 1954
- Tabanus glaucus Wiedemann, 1819
- Tabanus golovi Olsufiev, 1936
- Tabanus gonghaiensis Xu, 1979
- Tabanus gracilicornis Hine, 1925
- Tabanus gracilis Wiedemann, 1828
- Tabanus grandicauda Xu, 1979
- Tabanus grandis Szilády, 1923
- Tabanus granti Toumanoff, 1950
- Tabanus gratus Loew, 1858
- Tabanus gressitti Mackerras, 1972
- Tabanus griseifacies Schuurmans Stekhoven, 1926
- Tabanus griseilineis Philip, 1960
- Tabanus griseipalpis Schuurmans Stekhoven, 1926
- Tabanus griseithorax Schuurmans Stekhoven, 1926
- Tabanus griseoscutellatus Kröber, 1924
- Tabanus grunini Olsufiev, 1967
- Tabanus guapiensis Wilkerson, 1979
- Tabanus guatemalanus Hine, 1906
- Tabanus guineensis Wiedemann, 1824
- Tabanus guizhouensis Chen & Xu, 1992
- Tabanus guyanensis Macquart, 1846
- Tabanus guyonae (Surcouf, 1922)
- Tabanus gymnorhynchus Fairchild, 1980
- Tabanus gyruchus Burton, 1978

=== H-J ===
- Tabanus haemagogus Williston, 1901
- Tabanus haimovitchae Surcouf, 1909
- Tabanus hainanensis Stone, 1972
- Tabanus haitiensis Kröber, 1931
- Tabanus hakkariensis (Schacht, 1983)
- Tabanus hamoni Ovazza & Valade, 1958
- Tabanus hashemii Ježek, 1981
- Tabanus hauseri Olsufiev, 1967
- Tabanus haysi Philip, 1956
- Tabanus hedlundi Kapoor, Grewal & Sharma, 1991
- Tabanus hellenicus Peus, 1980
- Tabanus helvinus Burton, 1978
- Tabanus herbertensis Mackerras, 1964
- Tabanus herculeanus (Enderlein, 1925)
- Tabanus hipparionis Cockerell, 1909
- Tabanus hirsutus (Thunberg, 1827)
- Tabanus hirsutus Villers, 1789
- Tabanus hirtipalpis Ricardo, 1911
- Tabanus hirtistriatus Ricardo, 1911
- Tabanus hirtitibia Walker, 1850
- Tabanus hisarensis Veer, Parashar & Rao, 1999
- Tabanus hispanicus Peus, 1980
- Tabanus hispanus Peus, 1980
- Tabanus hissaricus Baratov, 1962
- Tabanus holtzianus (Enderlein, 1927)
- Tabanus honestus Walker, 1850
- Tabanus hongchowensis Liu, 1962
- Tabanus hongkongiensis Ricardo, 1916
- Tabanus hoogstraali Philip, 1959
- Tabanus howdeni (Philip, 1978)
- Tabanus huallagensis Fairchild, 1976
- Tabanus huangshanensis Xu & Wu, 1985
- Tabanus humboldti Fairchild, 1985
- Tabanus humilis Coquillett, 1898
- Tabanus humillimus Walker, 1857
- Tabanus humiloides Xu, 1980
- Tabanus hybridus Wiedemann, 1828
- Tabanus hypomacros Surcouf, 1922
- Tabanus hyugaensis Hayakawa, 1977
- Tabanus ianthinus Surcouf, 1907
- Tabanus iber Peus, 1980
- Tabanus ichiokai Ôuchi, 1943
- Tabanus ictericus Surcouf, 1922
- Tabanus idulis Burton, 1978
- Tabanus ignobilis Rondani, 1875
- Tabanus ilchanii Ježek, 1981
- Tabanus ilharcoi Dias, 1991
- Tabanus illustris Ricardo, 1913
- Tabanus imitans Walker, 1848
- Tabanus imitator Lutz, 1909
- Tabanus immanis Wiedemann, 1828
- Tabanus immixtus Walker, 1859
- Tabanus imparicallosus Schuurmans Stekhoven, 1926
- Tabanus impertinens Oldroyd, 1954
- Tabanus importunus Wiedemann, 1828
- Tabanus impurus Karsch, 1888
- Tabanus inaensis Asakawa & Takahasi, 1975
- Tabanus inaequannulatus Schuurmans Stekhoven, 1932
- Tabanus incohaerens Mackerras, 1972
- Tabanus inconspicuus (Walker, 1848)
- Tabanus incultus Wulp, 1881
- Tabanus indecisus (Bigot, 1892)
- Tabanus indianus Ricardo, 1911
- Tabanus indicus Fabricius, 1805
- Tabanus indifferens Szilády, 1926
- Tabanus indiscriminatus Ricardo, 1915
- Tabanus indistinctus Bigot, 1892
- Tabanus indosinensis Toumanoff, 1950
- Tabanus indrae Hauser, 1939
- Tabanus infans Walker, 1850
- Tabanus infestus Bogatchev & Samedov, 1949
- Tabanus inflatipalpis Schuurmans Stekhoven, 1926
- Tabanus ingens Schuurmans Stekhoven, 1926
- Tabanus inifromis Ricardo, 1911
- Tabanus innotabilis Walker, 1848
- Tabanus inobservatus Ricardo, 1911
- Tabanus insidiator Austen, 1922
- Tabanus insignis Loew, 1858
- Tabanus invalidus Szilády, 1926
- Tabanus isis Fairchild, 1976
- Tabanus itaituba Fairchild, 1985
- Tabanus ixion Osten Sacken, 1882
- Tabanus iyoensis Shiraki, 1918
- Tabanus jacobi Coher, 1963
- Tabanus jadini Fain, 1949
- Tabanus javanus Fabricius, 1805
- Tabanus jeanae Burton, 1978
- Tabanus jigongshanensis Xu, 1983
- Tabanus jigongshanoides Xu & Huang, 1990
- Tabanus jigonshanensis Xu, 1982
- Tabanus jilamensis Hine, 1925
- Tabanus jinghongensis Yang, Xu & Chen, 1999
- Tabanus jinhuai Xu & Sun, 2007
- Tabanus johannesi Fairchild, 1942
- Tabanus johnburgeri Xu & Xu, 1993
- Tabanus johnsoni Hine, 1907
- Tabanus joidus (Bigot, 1892)
- Tabanus joshii Coher, 1985
- Tabanus jucundus Walker, 1848
- Tabanus justorius Rondani, 1875

=== K-L ===
- Tabanus kabuensis Yao, 1984
- Tabanus kaburagii Murdoch & Takahasi, 1969
- Tabanus kakhyenensis Senior-White, 1922
- Tabanus kamengensis Datta & Das, 1978
- Tabanus karaosus Timmer, 1984
- Tabanus karenkoensis Shiraki, 1932
- Tabanus katoi Kono & Takahasi, 1940
- Tabanus kermani Abbassian-Lintzen, 1961
- Tabanus kesseli Philip, 1950
- Tabanus khalafi Leclercq, 1986
- Tabanus khasiensis Ricardo, 1909
- Tabanus kiangsuensis Kröber, 1933
- Tabanus kingi Austen, 1911
- Tabanus kinoshitai Kono & Takahasi, 1939
- Tabanus kisliuki Stone, 1940
- Tabanus konis Philip, 1960
- Tabanus kotoshoensis Shiraki, 1918
- Tabanus krombeini Burger, 1982
- Tabanus kumaonensis Kapoor, Grewal & Sharma, 1991
- Tabanus kumatai Matsumura & Takahasi, 1976
- Tabanus kumrakomensis Kapoor, Grewal & Sharma, 1991
- Tabanus kunmingensis Wang, 1985
- Tabanus kwangsinensis Wang & Liu, 1977
- Tabanus kwatta Fairchild, 1983
- Tabanus kwiluensis Oldroyd, 1954
- Tabanus lacajaensis Kröber, 1931
- Tabanus lacustris Stone, 1935
- Tabanus laetetinctus Becker, 1913
- Tabanus laevigatus Szilády, 1926
- Tabanus lamiensis Burger, 1991
- Tabanus laotianus (Bigot, 1890)
- Tabanus larvatus Burton, 1978
- Tabanus lateralbus Schuurmans Stekhoven, 1932
- Tabanus laticornis (Schuurmans Stekhoven, 1926)
- Tabanus laticornis Hine, 1904
- Tabanus latifascies Schuurmans Stekhoven, 1926
- Tabanus lavandoni Kröber, 1939
- Tabanus laverani Surcouf, 1907
- Tabanus leclercqi Abbassian-Lintzen, 1961
- Tabanus leleani Austen, 1920
- Tabanus lenticulatus Oldroyd, 1949
- Tabanus lenticuloides Mackerras, 1972
- Tabanus lentis Stone, 1972
- Tabanus lentisignatus Schuurmans Stekhoven, 1926
- Tabanus leucocnematus (Bigot, 1892)
- Tabanus leucohirtus Ricardo, 1909
- Tabanus leucomelas Walker, 1848
- Tabanus leucopogon (Bigot, 1892)
- Tabanus leucostomus Loew, 1858
- Tabanus levantinus Peus, 1980
- Tabanus leveri Mackerras & Rageau, 1958
- Tabanus lewisi Philip, 1957
- Tabanus liangshanensis Xu, 1979
- Tabanus lijiangensis Yang & Xu, 1993
- Tabanus limbatinevris Macquart, 1847
- Tabanus limbithorax (Macquart, 1855)
- Tabanus limushanensis Xu, 1979
- Tabanus lineataenia Xu, 1979
- Tabanus lineifrons Lutz, 1912
- Tabanus lineola var. hinellus Philip, 1960
- Tabanus lingfengi Xu, Zhan & Sun, 2006
- Tabanus lintzeni Zeegers & Müller, 2014
- Tabanus liventipes Surcouf, 1907
- Tabanus loczyi Szilády, 1926
- Tabanus longibasalis Schuurmans Stekhoven, 1926
- Tabanus longinquus Oldroyd, 1954
- Tabanus longistylus Xu, Ni & Xu, 1984
- Tabanus longiusculus Hine, 1907
- Tabanus longus Osten Sacken, 1876
- Tabanus loukashkini Philip, 1956
- Tabanus lubutuensis Bequaert, 1930
- Tabanus lucidulus Walker, 1848
- Tabanus lucifer Szilády, 1926
- Tabanus lufirensis Bequaert, 1913
- Tabanus luizae Dias, 1979
- Tabanus lunatus Fabricius, 1794
- Tabanus lushanensis Liu, 1962
- Tabanus lutzi Kröber, 1934
- Tabanus luzonensis Philip, 1959
- Tabanus lyneborgi Mackerras, 1972

=== M ===
- Tabanus macdonaldi Philip, 1960
- Tabanus macer (Bigot, 1892)
- Tabanus macfarlanei Ricardo, 1916
- Tabanus machadoi Dias, 1964
- Tabanus macilentus Coher, 1985
- Tabanus macquarti Schiner, 1868
- Tabanus maculicornis Zetterstedt, 1842
- Tabanus maculinevris Macquart, 1855
- Tabanus maculipennis Wiedemann, 1828
- Tabanus maculosus Coquillett, 1902
- Tabanus madoerensis Schuurmans Stekhoven, 1926
- Tabanus maedai Hayakawa, 1976
- Tabanus maini Mackerras, 1971
- Tabanus maiombensis Dias, 1973
- Tabanus makimurae Ôuchi, 1943
- Tabanus malayensis Ricardo, 1911
- Tabanus maliensis Goodwin, 1982
- Tabanus mandarinus Schiner, 1868
- Tabanus manipurensis Ricardo, 1913
- Tabanus marginalis Fabricius, 1805
- Tabanus marginatus Macquart, 1848
- Tabanus marginenevris Macquart, 1855
- Tabanus marianii (Leclercq, 1956)
- Tabanus marmorosus Surcouf, 1909
- Tabanus martini Surcouf, 1907
- Tabanus martinii Kröber, 1928
- Tabanus masamitsui Hayakawa, 1976
- Tabanus mateusi Dias, 1979
- Tabanus matosi Dias, 1966
- Tabanus matsumotoensis Murdoch & Takahasi, 1961
- Tabanus matsuzawai Hayakawa & Takahasi, 1983
- Tabanus matutinimordicus Xu, 1989
- Tabanus maurus Philip, 1974
- Tabanus mazzottii Philip, 1954
- Tabanus mediatrimaculatus Schuurmans Stekhoven, 1932
- Tabanus medionotatus Austen, 1912
- Tabanus meghalayensis Datta & Biswas, 1977
- Tabanus meihuashanensis Xu & Xu, 1992
- Tabanus melanocerus Wiedemann, 1828
- Tabanus melanogaster Brèthes, 1910
- Tabanus melanognathus (Bigot, 1890)
- Tabanus mendossai Dias, 1992
- Tabanus mengdingensis Xu, Xu & Sun, 2008
- Tabanus mengdingensis Xu, Xu & Sun, 2008
- Tabanus menoensis Taylor & Chainey, 1994
- Tabanus mentitus Walker, 1848
- Tabanus meraukensis Mackerras, 1964
- Tabanus meridionalis Thunberg, 1827
- Tabanus merychippi Cockerell, 1916
- Tabanus mesnili Surcouf, 1909
- Tabanus mesogaeus Burton, 1978
- Tabanus mesquitelai Dias, 1991
- Tabanus mianjangalensis Ježek, 1981
- Tabanus miki Brauer, 1880
- Tabanus miles Wiedemann, 1828
- Tabanus mindanensis Philip, 1959
- Tabanus miniatus Datta & Biswas, 1977
- Tabanus minimus Wulp, 1881
- Tabanus minuscularius Austen, 1912
- Tabanus minusculus Datta & Das, 1978
- Tabanus mishanensis Xu & Liu, 1982
- Tabanus mistshenkoi Olsufiev, 1937
- Tabanus mitidjensis Macquart, 1839
- Tabanus miyajima Ricardo, 1911
- Tabanus miyakei Shiraki, 1918
- Tabanus moderator Stone, 1938
- Tabanus modestus (Kröber, 1931)
- Tabanus moerens Fabricius, 1787
- Tabanus mofidii Leclercq, 1960
- Tabanus mogollon Burger, 1974
- Tabanus molestus Say, 1823
- Tabanus monchai Leclercq, 1962
- Tabanus mongolensis Kröber, 1933
- Tabanus monocallosus Dias, 1955
- Tabanus monoculus Doleschall, 1858
- Tabanus monoensis Hine, 1924
- Tabanus monokini Philip, 1966
- Tabanus monomiensis Takahasi, 1950
- Tabanus monops Bequaert, 1940
- Tabanus monotaeniatus (Bigot, 1892)
- Tabanus monotaxis Philip, 1967
- Tabanus montiasiaticus Olsufiev, 1977
- Tabanus morbosus Stone, 1938
- Tabanus mordax Austen, 1911
- Tabanus moreli Ovazza, 1962
- Tabanus morio Linnaeus, 1767
- Tabanus morsitans Ricardo, 1908
- Tabanus mossambicensis Dias, 1985
- Tabanus motuoensis Yao & Liu, 1983
- Tabanus mucronatus Fairchild, 1961
- Tabanus mularis Stone, 1935
- Tabanus multicinctus Schuurmans Stekhoven, 1926
- Tabanus murdochi Philip, 1961
- Tabanus muruensis Mackerras, 1964
- Tabanus muscoides Toumanoff, 1950
- Tabanus mutatus Wang & Liu, 1990

=== N ===
- Tabanus namdaphaicus Datta & Chakraborti, 1985
- Tabanus namibiensis Dias, 1989
- Tabanus nanpingensis Xu, Xu & Sun, 2008
- Tabanus nantae Toumanoff, 1950
- Tabanus napaensis Nieschulz, 1927
- Tabanus nartshukae Olsufiev, 1972
- Tabanus neavei Austen, 1912
- Tabanus nebulosus De Geer, 1776
- Tabanus nefarius Hine, 1907
- Tabanus nefas Usher, 1971
- Tabanus neglectus Kröber, 1931
- Tabanus negritos Philip, 1959
- Tabanus nematocallus Fairchild, 1985
- Tabanus nemocallosus Ricardo, 1909
- Tabanus nemoralis Meigen, 1820
- Tabanus neoindianus Philip, 1959
- Tabanus neovestitus Kröber, 1931
- Tabanus nepalensis Coher, 1971
- Tabanus nephodes (Bigot, 1892)
- Tabanus nereus Fairchild, 1943
- Tabanus nexus Walker, 1856
- Tabanus nicobarensis Schiner, 1868
- Tabanus nigeriensis Crosskey, 1959
- Tabanus nigrabdominis Wang, 1982
- Tabanus nigrefronti Liu, 1981
- Tabanus nigrescens Palisot de Beauvois, 1809
- Tabanus nigrhinus Philip, 1962
- Tabanus nigricaudus Xu, 1981
- Tabanus nigrifascies (Bigot, 1892)
- Tabanus nigrifeminibus Austen, 1912
- Tabanus nigrifer Walker, 1871
- Tabanus nigrihinus Philip, 1962
- Tabanus nigrimaculatus Xu, 1981
- Tabanus nigrimanus Walker, 1848
- Tabanus nigrimordicus Xu, 1979
- Tabanus nigripes Wiedemann, 1821
- Tabanus nigriventris Macquart, 1846
- Tabanus nigrofemoratus Kröber, 1929
- Tabanus nigrostriatus Ricardo, 1908
- Tabanus nigrotectus (Bigot, 1890)
- Tabanus nigrovittatus Macquart, 1847
- Tabanus nilakinus Philip, 1960
- Tabanus nipponicus Murdoch & Takahasi, 1969
- Tabanus niveinotatus Bequaert, 1930
- Tabanus noctuinus Schuurmans Stekhoven, 1926
- Tabanus nondescriptus Fairchild, 1973
- Tabanus notatus Ricardo, 1915
- Tabanus novaescotiae Macquart, 1847
- Tabanus nyasae Ricardo, 1900
- Tabanus nyctops Burton, 1978

=== O ===
- Tabanus obconicus Walker, 1850
- Tabanus obesus (Bigot, 1892)
- Tabanus obliquemaculatus Macquart, 1838
- Tabanus obscuratus Walker, 1864
- Tabanus obscurefumatus Surcouf, 1906
- Tabanus obscurehirtus Ricardo, 1908
- Tabanus obscurestigmatus Bigot, 1859
- Tabanus obscurestriatus Ricardo, 1908
- Tabanus obscurilineatus Taylor, 1919
- Tabanus obscurior Ricardo, 1908
- Tabanus obscurus Xu, 1983
- Tabanus obsolescens Pandellé, 1883
- Tabanus obsoletimaculus Xu, 1983
- Tabanus obsoletus Wiedemann, 1821
- Tabanus obtusipalpis Schuurmans Stekhoven, 1926
- Tabanus obumbratus Bequaert, 1940
- Tabanus occidentalis Linnaeus, 1758
- Tabanus occidentalis Oldroyd, 1954
- Tabanus ochroater Schuurmans Stekhoven, 1926
- Tabanus ochroceras Schuurmans Stekhoven, 1932
- Tabanus ochrogaster Schuurmans Stekhoven, 1932
- Tabanus ochros Schuurmans Stekhoven, 1926
- Tabanus octulus Walker, 1848
- Tabanus okinawanoides Xu, 1989
- Tabanus okinawanus Shiraki, 1918
- Tabanus oknos Surcouf, 1922
- Tabanus oldroydi Philip, 1941
- Tabanus olivaceiventris Macquart, 1847
- Tabanus oliviventris Xu, 1979
- Tabanus oliviventroides Xu, 1984
- Tabanus olsufjevi Hauser, 1960
- Tabanus olympius Peus, 1980
- Tabanus omeishanensis Xu, 1979
- Tabanus omnirobustus Wang, 1988
- Tabanus onoi Murdoch & Takahasi, 1969
- Tabanus opalescens Schuurmans Stekhoven, 1926
- Tabanus oppugnator Austen, 1925
- Tabanus optatus Walker, 1856
- Tabanus orbicallus Philip, 1936
- Tabanus orbis Burton, 1978
- Tabanus oreophilus Xu & Liao, 1985
- Tabanus orientalis Wiedemann, 1824
- Tabanus orientis Walker, 1848
- Tabanus orphnos Wang, 1982
- Tabanus otsurui Ogawa, 1960
- Tabanus ovazzai Crosskey, 1959
- Tabanus oviventris Schuurmans Stekhoven, 1926
- Tabanus oxybeles Burton, 1978
- Tabanus oxyceratus (Bigot, 1892)

=== P ===
- Tabanus pachypalpus (Bigot, 1892)
- Tabanus paganus Chen, 1984
- Tabanus palauensis Takahashi, 1944
- Tabanus palawanensis Philip, 1959
- Tabanus pallidepectoratus (Bigot, 1892)
- Tabanus pallidifacies Surcouf, 1906
- Tabanus pallidipes Austen, 1920
- Tabanus pallidiscutum Philip, 1959
- Tabanus pallidiventer Schuurmans Stekhoven, 1926
- Tabanus pallipennis Macquart, 1846
- Tabanus palpalis Brèthes, 1910
- Tabanus palpinus Palisot de Beauvois, 1819
- Tabanus papuensis Oldroyd, 1964
- Tabanus par Walker, 1854
- Tabanus parabactrianus Liu, 1960
- Tabanus parabrunneus Schuurmans Stekhoven, 1932
- Tabanus parabuddha Xu, 1983
- Tabanus parachinensis Xu, Zhan & Sun, 2006
- Tabanus parachrysater Yao, 1984
- Tabanus paradiversifrons Xu & Guo, 2005
- Tabanus paradiversifrons Xu, 2005
- Tabanus paradoxus Jaennicke, 1866
- Tabanus parafuscomaculatus Schuurmans Stekhoven, 1932
- Tabanus parahippi Cockerell, 1909
- Tabanus parahybridus Schuurmans Stekhoven, 1932
- Tabanus paraichiokai Xu, Xu & Sun, 2008
- Tabanus parallelifrons Schuurmans Stekhoven, 1926
- Tabanus paralleliventer Schuurmans Stekhoven, 1926
- Tabanus pararubidus Yao & Liu, 2008
- Tabanus pararufiventris Nieschulz, 1927
- Tabanus parasexcinctus Xu & Sun, 2008
- Tabanus parawuyishanensis Xu & Sun, 2007
- Tabanus parimmixtus Schuurmans Stekhoven, 1932
- Tabanus particaecus Hardy, 1948
- Tabanus particolor Szilády, 1926
- Tabanus parvicallosus Ricardo, 1914
- Tabanus parvidentatus Macquart, 1838
- Tabanus parviformus Wang, 1985
- Tabanus passosi Dias, 1974
- Tabanus patriarchus Oldroyd, 1949
- Tabanus pauper Rondani, 1875
- Tabanus paviei Burton, 1978
- Tabanus pazukii Ježek, 1990
- Tabanus pellucidus Fabricius, 1805
- Tabanus pellus Philip, 1959
- Tabanus penai Philip, 1967
- Tabanus pendleburyi Philip, 1960
- Tabanus pengquensis Zhu & Xu, 1995
- Tabanus perakiensis Ricardo, 1911
- Tabanus perelegans Olsufiev, 1972
- Tabanus perileucus Philip, 1974
- Tabanus persimilis Dolin & Andreeva, 1986
- Tabanus pertinens Austen, 1912
- Tabanus peruvianus Macquart, 1848
- Tabanus petiolatus Hine, 1917
- Tabanus petiscai Dias, 1974
- Tabanus philippinensis Kröber, 1924
- Tabanus piceiventris Rondani, 1848
- Tabanus picicalosus Fairchild, 1951
- Tabanus pictiventris Szilády, 1926
- Tabanus pingxiangensis Xu & Liao, 1985
- Tabanus platensis Brèthes, 1910
- Tabanus platycerus Fairchild, 1976
- Tabanus pleskei Kröber, 1925
- Tabanus pluto Walker, 1848
- Tabanus pollinosus Ricardo, 1913
- Tabanus polygonus Walker, 1854
- Tabanus polyphemus Fairchild, 1958
- Tabanus portschinskii Olsufiev, 1937
- Tabanus postactus Oldroyd, 1947
- Tabanus praematurus Austen, 1922
- Tabanus praepilatus Fairchild, 1943
- Tabanus praepositus Walker, 1848
- Tabanus praeteritus Fairchild, 1947
- Tabanus pratti Ricardo, 1911
- Tabanus prefulventer Wang, 1985
- Tabanus primitivus Walker, 1848
- Tabanus principis Bequaert, 1930
- Tabanus priscoides Schuurmans Stekhoven, 1926
- Tabanus pristinus Burton, 1978
- Tabanus procallosus Lutz, 1912
- Tabanus provincialis Ricardo, 1913
- Tabanus proximus Walker, 1848
- Tabanus pruinosus Bigot, 1892
- Tabanus prunicolor Lutz, 1912
- Tabanus pseudoculus Fairchild, 1942
- Tabanus pseudogratus Goodwin, 1982
- Tabanus pseudoliviventris Chen & Xu, 1992
- Tabanus pseudolunatus Dias, 1979
- Tabanus pseudolunatus Dias, 1980
- Tabanus pseudonebulosus Gorayeb, 2006
- Tabanus pseudothoracinus Dias, 1996
- Tabanus ptolemaeanus Szilády, 1923
- Tabanus pullulus Austen, 1912
- Tabanus pullus Philippi, 1865
- Tabanus pulvifer Walker, 1854
- Tabanus pumilus Macquart, 1838
- Tabanus punctifer Osten Sacken, 1876
- Tabanus punctipleura Hine, 1920
- Tabanus puncturius Xu & Liao, 1985
- Tabanus pungens Wiedemann, 1828
- Tabanus pusillus Macquart, 1838
- Tabanus puteus Ricardo, 1911

=== Q-R ===
- Tabanus qinlingensis Wang, 1985
- Tabanus quadrifocus Burton, 1978
- Tabanus quadriguttatus Ricardo, 1908
- Tabanus quadrisignatus Ricardo, 1908
- Tabanus quadritriangularis Schuurmans Stekhoven, 1932
- Tabanus quaesitus Stone, 1938
- Tabanus quatei Philip, 1962
- Tabanus quatuornotatus Meigen, 1820
- Tabanus queenslandii Ricardo, 1914
- Tabanus quinarius Wang & Liu, 1990
- Tabanus quinquecinctus Ricardo, 1914
- Tabanus quinquepunctatus Hine, 1925
- Tabanus quinquetriangularis Schuurmans Stekhoven, 1932
- Tabanus quinquevittatus Wiedemann, 1821
- Tabanus rageaui Oldroyd, 1954
- Tabanus rallus Philip, 1978
- Tabanus rectilineatus Schuurmans Stekhoven, 1926
- Tabanus rectus Loew, 1858
- Tabanus recusans Walker, 1858
- Tabanus reducens Walker, 1859
- Tabanus regularis Jaennicke, 1866
- Tabanus reinwardtii Wiedemann, 1828
- Tabanus remotus Walker, 1848
- Tabanus restrepoensis Fairchild, 1942
- Tabanus rhinargus Philip, 1962
- Tabanus rhizonshine Philip, 1954
- Tabanus rhizophorae Fairchild, 1943
- Tabanus ricardae Surcouf, 1906
- Tabanus rixator Fairchild, 1943
- Tabanus riyadhae Amoudi & Leclercq, 1988
- Tabanus rockefelleri Philip, 1954
- Tabanus rondoniensis Henriques, Krolow, Zamarchi & Camargo, 2022
- Tabanus rosarioi Dias, 1994
- Tabanus rosselensis Mackerras, 1964
- Tabanus rossi Philip, 1959
- Tabanus rothschildi Surcouf, 1906
- Tabanus roubaudi Toumanoff, 1950
- Tabanus rousselii Macquart, 1839
- Tabanus rubicundulus Austen, 1922
- Tabanus rubicundus Macquart, 1846
- Tabanus rubidaceus Dias, 1975
- Tabanus rubidoides Szilády, 1926
- Tabanus rubidus Wiedemann, 1821
- Tabanus rubiginosus Walker, 1850
- Tabanus rubioi Dias, 1987
- Tabanus rubricauda Philip, 1958
- Tabanus rubripes Macquart, 1838
- Tabanus rubriscutatus Schuurmans Stekhoven, 1926
- Tabanus rubriventris Macquart, 1838
- Tabanus ruficoloratus Philip, 1960
- Tabanus rufidens Bigot, 1887
- Tabanus rufimedius Szilády, 1926
- Tabanus rufioloratus Philip, 1960
- Tabanus rufipes Palisot de Beauvois, 1806
- Tabanus rufiscutellatus Schuurmans Stekhoven, 1926
- Tabanus rufiventris Fabricius, 1805
- Tabanus rufofrater Walker, 1850
- Tabanus ruoqiangensis Xiang & Xu, 1986
- Tabanus rupinae Austen, 1920
- Tabanus rupium (Brauer, 1880)
- Tabanus russatoides Xu & Deng, 1990
- Tabanus russatus Wang, 1982
- Tabanus rusticatus Burton, 1978
- Tabanus ryukyuensis Murdoch & Takahasi, 1961

=== S ===
- Tabanus sabuletoroides Xu, 1979
- Tabanus sabuletorum Loew, 1874
- Tabanus sackeni Fairchild, 1934
- Tabanus safavii Ježek, 1981
- Tabanus sagax Osten Sacken, 1876
- Tabanus sagittipalpis Szilády, 1926
- Tabanus samarensis Philip, 1959
- Tabanus samawangensis Burger, 1988
- Tabanus samoensis Ferguson, 1927
- Tabanus sandersoni Austen, 1912
- Tabanus sannio Fairchild, 1956
- Tabanus sanyaensis Xu, Xu & Sun, 2008
- Tabanus sapporoensis Shiraki, 1918
- Tabanus sapporoenus Shiraki, 1918
- Tabanus sarbazensis Ježek, 1990
- Tabanus sarmentoi Dias, 1959
- Tabanus sasai Watanabe & Takahasi, 1971
- Tabanus sauteri Ricardo, 1913
- Tabanus saxicolus Usher, 1965
- Tabanus sayensis Xu, Xu & Sun, 2008
- Tabanus schadei Fairchild, 1976
- Tabanus schiva Moucha & Chvála, 1959
- Tabanus scholae Oldroyd, 1954
- Tabanus scutellus Philip, 1970
- Tabanus searsi Philip, 1978
- Tabanus secedens Walker, 1854
- Tabanus secundus Walker, 1848
- Tabanus selene Schuurmans Stekhoven, 1926
- Tabanus selousi Austen, 1912
- Tabanus selvaticus Burger, Bermúdez & Bermúdez, 1987
- Tabanus semenovi Olsufiev, 1937
- Tabanus semiargenteus Olsufiev, 1937
- Tabanus semicircularis Ricardo, 1913
- Tabanus semirufus Szilády, 1926
- Tabanus separatus Efflatoun, 1930
- Tabanus sepiensis Philip, 1954
- Tabanus sepikensis Oldroyd, 1964
- Tabanus sequens Walker, 1848
- Tabanus sequens Walker, 1850
- Tabanus sericiventris Loew, 1858
- Tabanus serpentina Wiedemann, 1828
- Tabanus serus Walker, 1861
- Tabanus servillei Macquart, 1838
- Tabanus sexcinctus Ricardo, 1911
- Tabanus sextriangulus Gorayeb & Rafael, 1984
- Tabanus shaanxiensis Xu, Lu & Wu, 1990
- Tabanus shannonellus Kröber, 1936
- Tabanus shantungensis Ôuchi, 1943
- Tabanus shelkovnikovi Paramonov, 1934
- Tabanus shennongjianensis Xu, Ni & Xu, 1984
- Tabanus shikokuensis Murdoch & Takahasi, 1961
- Tabanus shyamarupi Datta & Chakraborti, 1985
- Tabanus siamensis Ricardo, 1911
- Tabanus siassensis Mackerras, 1964
- Tabanus siccus Walker, 1850
- Tabanus sidneyensis Macquart, 1846
- Tabanus siebersi Schuurmans Stekhoven, 1928
- Tabanus sierensis Burger, Bermúdez & Bermúdez, 1987
- Tabanus sierrensis Burger, Bermúdez & Bermúdez, 1987
- Tabanus signatipennis Portschinsky, 1887
- Tabanus signifer Walker, 1856
- Tabanus significans Ricardo, 1911
- Tabanus significans var. inaequisignatus Schuurmans Stekhoven, 1932
- Tabanus silvanus Ricardo, 1908
- Tabanus similis Macquart, 1850
- Tabanus simplicissimus Walker, 1856
- Tabanus simpsoni Austen, 1912
- Tabanus sinewitensis Mackerras, 1972
- Tabanus sinicus Walker, 1848
- Tabanus skarduensis Abro, 1992
- Tabanus soembawensis Schuurmans Stekhoven, 1926
- Tabanus sorbillans Wiedemann, 1828
- Tabanus soubiroui Surcouf, 1922
- Tabanus sowi Goodwin, 1982
- Tabanus sparus Whitney, 1879
- Tabanus speciosus Ricardo, 1911
- Tabanus spectabilis Loew, 1858
- Tabanus speculum Walker, 1861
- Tabanus sphinx Philip, 1960
- Tabanus spodopteroides Olsufiev, Moucha & Chvála, 1969
- Tabanus spodopterus Wiedemann, 1820
- Tabanus stabilis Wang, 1982
- Tabanus stackelbergiellus Olsufiev, 1967
- Tabanus sticticolis Surcouf, 1906
- Tabanus stonei Philip, 1941
- Tabanus strangmannii Ricardo, 1914
- Tabanus striatus Fabricius, 1787
- Tabanus strigimaculus Fairchild, 1942
- Tabanus strix Szilády, 1923
- Tabanus stueberi Oldroyd, 1949
- Tabanus stygius Say, 1823
- Tabanus subbasalis Kapoor, Grewal & Sharma, 1991
- Tabanus subcaeruleus Peus, 1980
- Tabanus subcamipus Philip, 1960
- Tabanus subcanipus Philip, 1960
- Tabanus subcinerascens Ricardo, 1911
- Tabanus subcinerescens Mackerras, 1971
- Tabanus subcinnamoneus Mackerras, 1972
- Tabanus subcohaerens Mackerras, 1964
- Tabanus subcordiger Liu, 1960
- Tabanus subcrassus Kapoor, Grewal & Sharma, 1991
- Tabanus subfemoralis Philip, 1978
- Tabanus subflavicornis Philip, 1970
- Tabanus subfurvicaudus Wu & Xu, 1992
- Tabanus subhybridus Philip, 1960
- Tabanus subimmanis Philip, 1959
- Tabanus subjoidus Philip, 1959
- Tabanus sublongus Stone, 1938
- Tabanus submacilentus Coher, 1985
- Tabanus submalayensis Wang & Liu, 1977
- Tabanus subniger Coquillett, 1906
- Tabanus suboliviventris Xu, 1984
- Tabanus subpulliomaculatus Xu & Zhang, 1990
- Tabanus subpullomaculatus Xu & Zhang, 1990
- Tabanus subrecusans Mackerras, 1964
- Tabanus subruber Bellardi, 1859
- Tabanus subrubidus Chvála & Lyneborg, 1970
- Tabanus subrussatus Wang, 1982
- Tabanus subsabuletorum Olsufiev, 1936
- Tabanus subsimilis Bellardi, 1859
- Tabanus subsinerascens Ricardo, 1911
- Tabanus subviolaceus Fairchild, 1961
- Tabanus succurvus Walker, 1859
- Tabanus sudeticus Zeller, 1842
- Tabanus sufis Jaennicke, 1867
- Tabanus sugens Wiedemann, 1828
- Tabanus sulfurescens Schuurmans Stekhoven, 1932
- Tabanus sumatrensis Macquart, 1834
- Tabanus superjumentarius Whitney, 1879
- Tabanus surifer Fairchild, 1964
- Tabanus swiridowi Portschinsky, 1881
- Tabanus symmetrus Burton, 1978
- Tabanus syriacus Kröber, 1925
- Tabanus systenus Burton, 1978
- Tabanus szechenyianus Szilády, 1926
- Tabanus sziladyi Schuurmans Stekhoven, 1932

=== T ===
- Tabanus taeniatus Macquart, 1834
- Tabanus taeniellus Philip, 1960
- Tabanus taeniola Palisot de Beauvois, 1806
- Tabanus taiensis Taylor & Chainey, 1994
- Tabanus taipingensis Xu & Wu, 1985
- Tabanus taiwanus Hayakawa & Takahasi, 1983
- Tabanus talyshi Olsufiev, 1972
- Tabanus tambaensis Murdoch & Takahasi, 1969
- Tabanus tamthaiorum Burton, 1978
- Tabanus tangi Xu & Xu, 1992
- Tabanus tardinotus Bequaert, 1940
- Tabanus taygetus Peus, 1980
- Tabanus teishengi Xu & Sun, 2007
- Tabanus tenasserimi Szilády, 1926
- Tabanus tendeiroi Dias, 1980
- Tabanus tenebrosus Walker, 1854
- Tabanus tenens Walker, 1850
- Tabanus tenuifrons Datta & Chakraborti, 1985
- Tabanus tenuipalpis Austen, 1912
- Tabanus tenuis Schuurmans Stekhoven, 1932
- Tabanus tenuistria Kröber, 1931
- Tabanus tephrodes Philippi, 1865
- Tabanus teraiensis Coher, 1971
- Tabanus tergestinus Egger, 1859
- Tabanus terterjani Andreeva & Dolin, 1982
- Tabanus testaceiventris Macquart, 1847
- Tabanus tetropsis Bigot, 1892
- Tabanus texanus Hine, 1907
- Tabanus thellus Burger, 1982
- Tabanus thermarum Burton, 1978
- Tabanus thiemeana (Enderlein, 1925)
- Tabanus thoracinus Palisot de Beauvois, 1806
- Tabanus thurmani Philip, 1960
- Tabanus tianyui Xu & Sun, 2008
- Tabanus tienmuensis Liu, 1962
- Tabanus tiluensis Nieschulz, 1927
- Tabanus tinctothorax Ricardo, 1911
- Tabanus tinctus Walker, 1850
- Tabanus titoi Dias, 1962
- Tabanus tokaraensis Hayakawa & Suzuki, 1984
- Tabanus tokunoshimaensis Hayakawa & Suzuki, 1984
- Tabanus tonglai Surcouf, 1922
- Tabanus toshiokai Murdoch & Takahasi, 1969
- Tabanus toumanoffi Philip, 1960
- Tabanus townsendi Johnson, 1919
- Tabanus townsvilli Ricardo, 1915
- Tabanus traubi Philip, 1960
- Tabanus trianguliger Austen, 1912
- Tabanus triangulum Wiedemann, 1828
- Tabanus tricoloratus Schuurmans Stekhoven, 1926
- Tabanus tricolorus Xu, 1981
- Tabanus trigonus Coquillett, 1898
- Tabanus trijunctus Walker, 1854
- Tabanus trilineatus Latreille, 1817
- Tabanus trimaculatus
- Tabanus tripurensis Datta, 1986
- Tabanus triquetrornatus Carter, 1915
- Tabanus tristichus Fairchild, 1976
- Tabanus tristis Wulp, 1881
- Tabanus trivittatus Fabricius, 1805
- Tabanus tuberculatus Ricardo, 1911
- Tabanus tumidicallus Burger, 1982
- Tabanus tumiscapens Philip, 1954
- Tabanus turbidus Wiedemann, 1828

=== U-V ===
- Tabanus umbripennis Ricardo, 1915
- Tabanus undulans Schuurmans Stekhoven, 1926
- Tabanus unicinctus Loew, 1856
- Tabanus unicus Burton, 1978
- Tabanus unifasciatus Loew, 1858
- Tabanus unifasciens Philip, 1959
- Tabanus uniformis Ricardo, 1911
- Tabanus unilineatus Loew, 1852
- Tabanus unipunctatus (Bigot, 1892)
- Tabanus unistriatus Hine, 1906
- Tabanus univentris Walker, 1848
- Tabanus ustus Walker, 1850
- Tabanus vanleeuweni Oldroyd, 1949
- Tabanus varelai Dias, 1980
- Tabanus variabilis Loew, 1858
- Tabanus varipes Walker, 1836
- Tabanus variventris Macquart, 1847
- Tabanus vaseyi Sherman, 1991
- Tabanus vectensis (Cockerell, 1921)
- Tabanus velutinus Surcouf, 1906
- Tabanus ventriflavimarginatus Schuurmans Stekhoven, 1926
- Tabanus venustus Osten Sacken, 1876
- Tabanus vernus Burton, 1978
- Tabanus vestitus Wiedemann, 1819
- Tabanus veterinarius Dias, 1964
- Tabanus vibex Suh, Choi & Kwon, 2002
- Tabanus violaceus Schuurmans Stekhoven, 1926
- Tabanus virgulatus Austen, 1922
- Tabanus vittiger Thomson, 1869
- Tabanus vivax Osten Sacken, 1876
- Tabanus vix Philip, 1960

=== W-Z ===
- Tabanus wallacei Szilády, 1926
- Tabanus weiheensis Xu & Liu, 1980
- Tabanus weiningensis Xu, Xu & Sun, 2008
- Tabanus wellmanii Austen, 1908
- Tabanus wenzeli Philip, 1959
- Tabanus weyrauchi Barretto, 1949
- Tabanus wiedemanni Osten Sacken, 1876
- Tabanus williamsii Austen, 1908
- Tabanus wilpattuensis Burger, 1982
- Tabanus wilsoni Pechuman, 1962
- Tabanus wokei Fairchild, 1983
- Tabanus woollastoni Ricardo, 1913
- Tabanus wuyishanensis Xu & Xu, 1995
- Tabanus wuzhishanensis Xu, 1979
- Tabanus wyndhamensis Mackerras, 1971
- Tabanus xanthocorus Burton, 1978
- Tabanus xanthogaster Philippi, 1865
- Tabanus xanthoimus Philip, 1960
- Tabanus xanthomelas Austen, 1912
- Tabanus xanthos Wang, 1982
- Tabanus xanti Szilády, 1926
- Tabanus xenorhynchus Fairchild, 1947
- Tabanus xerodes Philip, 1967
- Tabanus xuezhongi Xu & Guo, 2005
- Tabanus xuthopogon Fairchild, 1985
- Tabanus xuthus Philip, 1960
- Tabanus yablonicus Takagi, 1941
- Tabanus yadongensis Xu & Sun, 2007
- Tabanus yaeyamaensis Hayakawa & Hasegawa, 1981
- Tabanus yakuensis Ôuchi, 1943
- Tabanus yanbaruensis Hayakawa & Yoneyama, 1983
- Tabanus yao Macquart, 1855
- Tabanus yasujensis Ježek, 1981
- Tabanus yishanensis Xu, 1979
- Tabanus yoneyamai Hayakawa, 1984
- Tabanus yoshimotoi Burger, 1991
- Tabanus yucatanus Townsend, 1897
- Tabanus yulensis Röder, 1892
- Tabanus yunnanensis Liu & Wang, 1977
- Tabanus zancala (Philip, 1954)
- Tabanus zayaensis Xu & Sun, 2007
- Tabanus zayasi Cruz & García, 1974
- Tabanus zayuensis Wang, 1982
- Tabanus zebrinus Schuurmans Stekhoven, 1932
- Tabanus zeirii Ježek, 1981
- Tabanus zhongpingi Xu & Guo, 2005
- Tabanus zimini Olsufiev, 1937
- Tabanus zodiacus Burton, 1978
- Tabanus zoster Philip, 1960
- Tabanus zoulouensis (Bigot, 1892)
- Tabanus zuhairi Al-Talafha, Yaakop, Nurul Fatihah & Idris, 2018
- Tabanus zummingi Xu & Sun, 2007
- Tabanus zythicolor Philip, 1936
