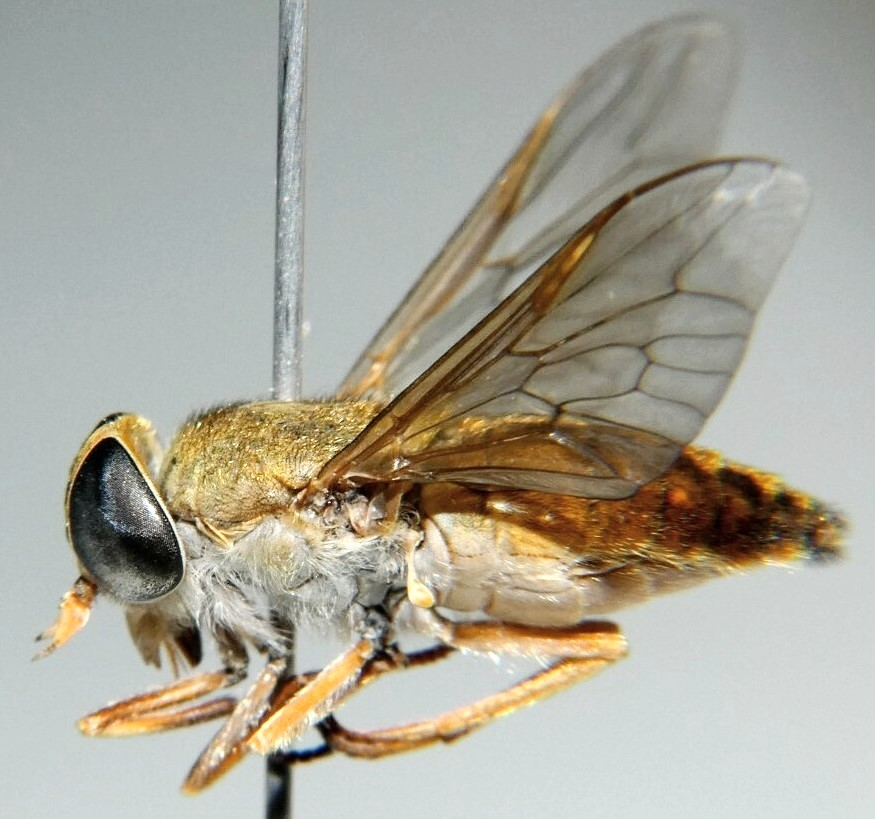

Scientific classification
- Kingdom: Animalia
- Phylum: Arthropoda
- Clade: Pancrustacea
- Class: Insecta
- Order: Diptera
- Family: Tabanidae
- Subfamily: Tabaninae
- Tribe: Tabanini
- Genus: Tabanus
- Species: T. pallidescens

Binomial name
- Tabanus pallidescens Philip, 1936

Synonyms
- Tabanus fulvulus var. pallidescens Philip, 1936

= Tabanus pallidescens =

Species of fly

Tabanus pallidescens is a species of horse fly in the family Tabanidae.

== Distribution ==
United States.
