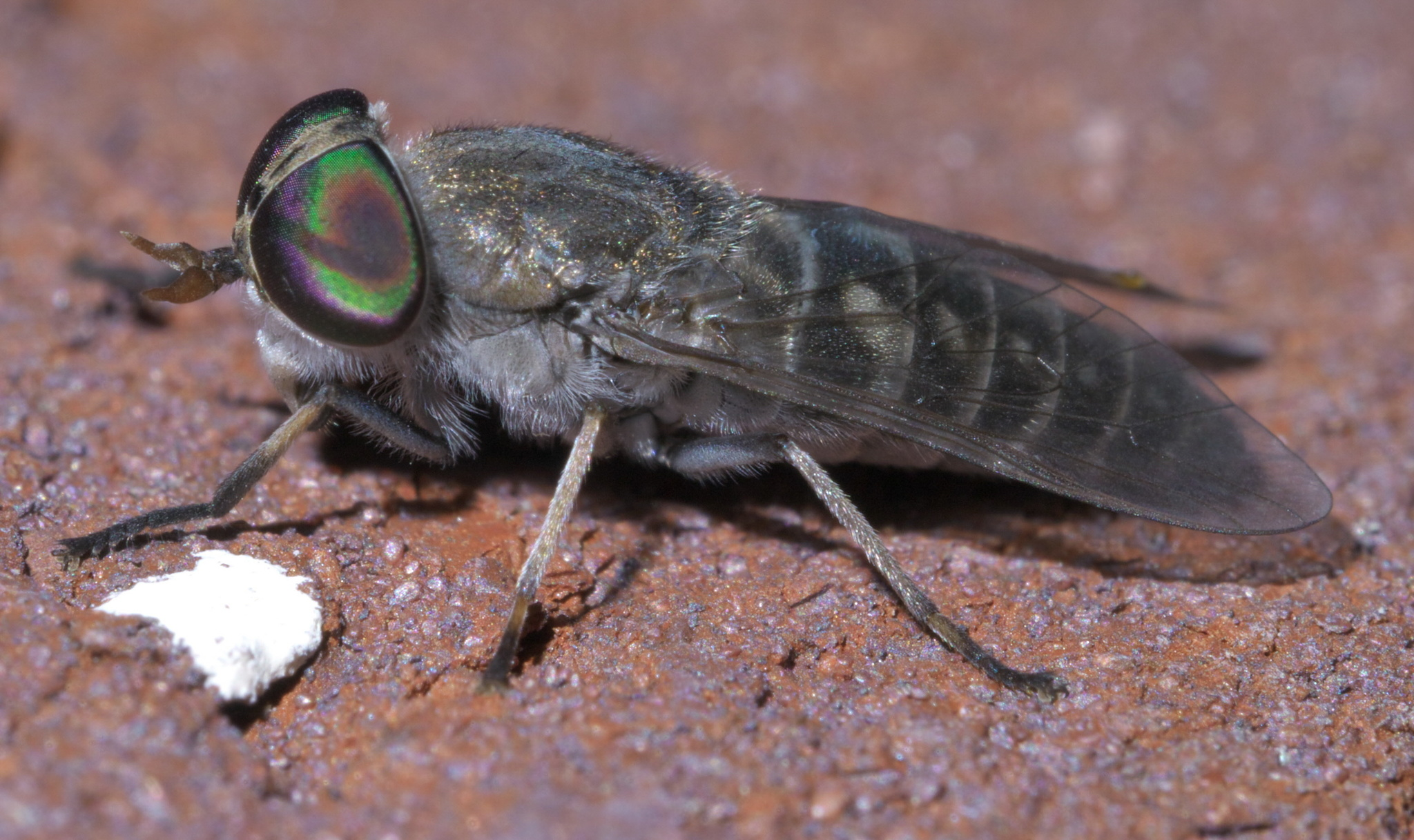
- Tabanus sparus, Oklahoma

Scientific classification
- Kingdom: Animalia
- Phylum: Arthropoda
- Clade: Pancrustacea
- Class: Insecta
- Order: Diptera
- Family: Tabanidae
- Subfamily: Tabaninae
- Tribe: Tabanini
- Genus: Tabanus
- Species: T. sparus

Binomial name
- Tabanus sparus Whitney, 1879

Synonyms
- Tabanus milleri Whitney, 1914

= Tabanus sparus =

Species of fly

Tabanus sparus is a species of horse fly in the family Tabanidae.

== Distribution ==
United States.

== Subspecies ==
These two subspecies belong to the species Tabanus sparus:

- Tabanus sparus milleri Whitney, 1914
- Tabanus sparus sparus Whitney, 1879
