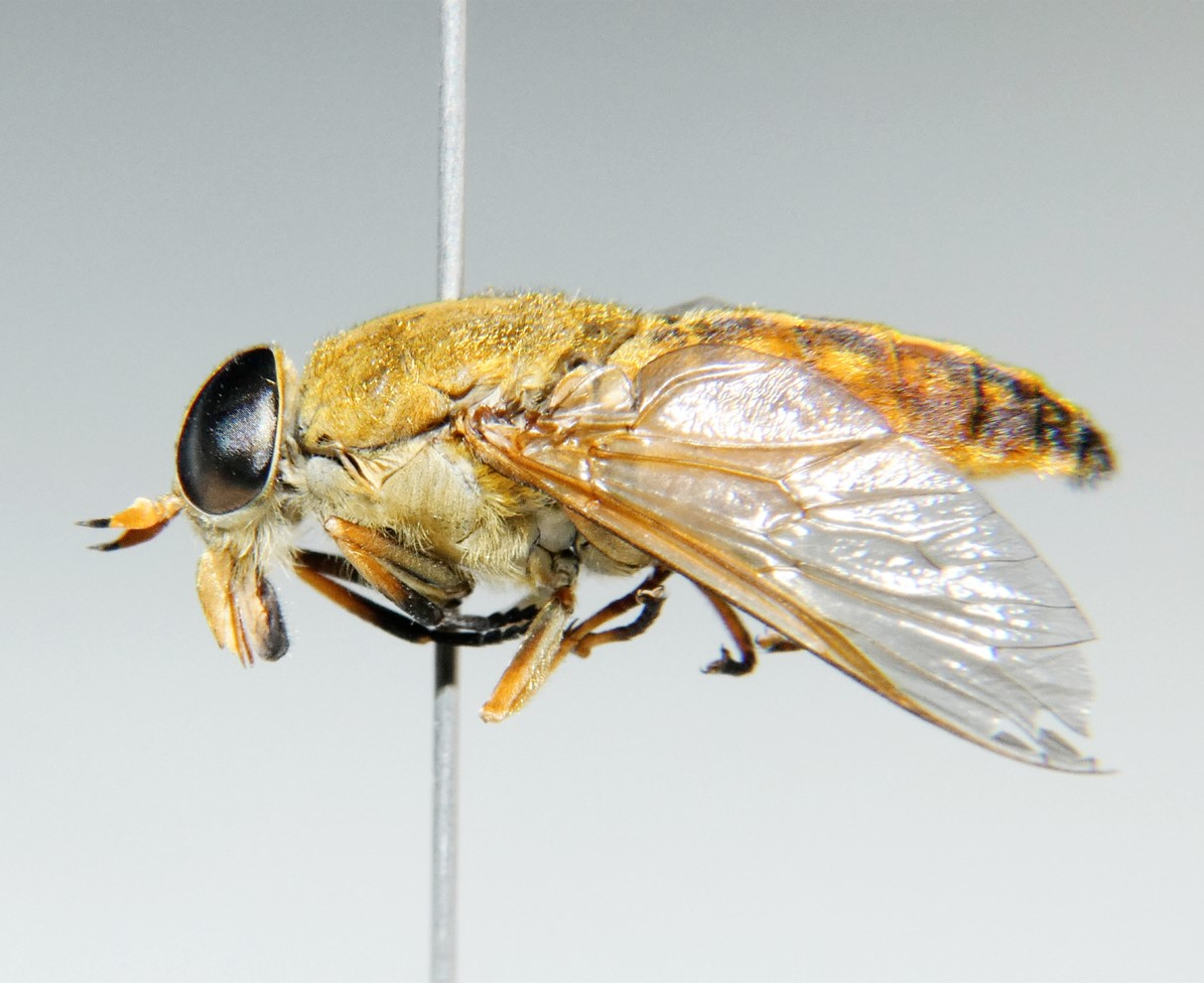

Scientific classification
- Kingdom: Animalia
- Phylum: Arthropoda
- Clade: Pancrustacea
- Class: Insecta
- Order: Diptera
- Family: Tabanidae
- Subfamily: Tabaninae
- Tribe: Tabanini
- Genus: Tabanus
- Species: T. fulvulus

Binomial name
- Tabanus fulvulus Wiedemann, 1828

Synonyms
- Tabanus fulvofrater Walker, 1848; Tabanus mutatus Walker, 1850

= Tabanus fulvulus =

Species of fly

Tabanus fulvulus is a horse fly in the subfamily Tabaninae ("horse flies"), in the order Diptera ("flies").

== Distribution ==
United States.
