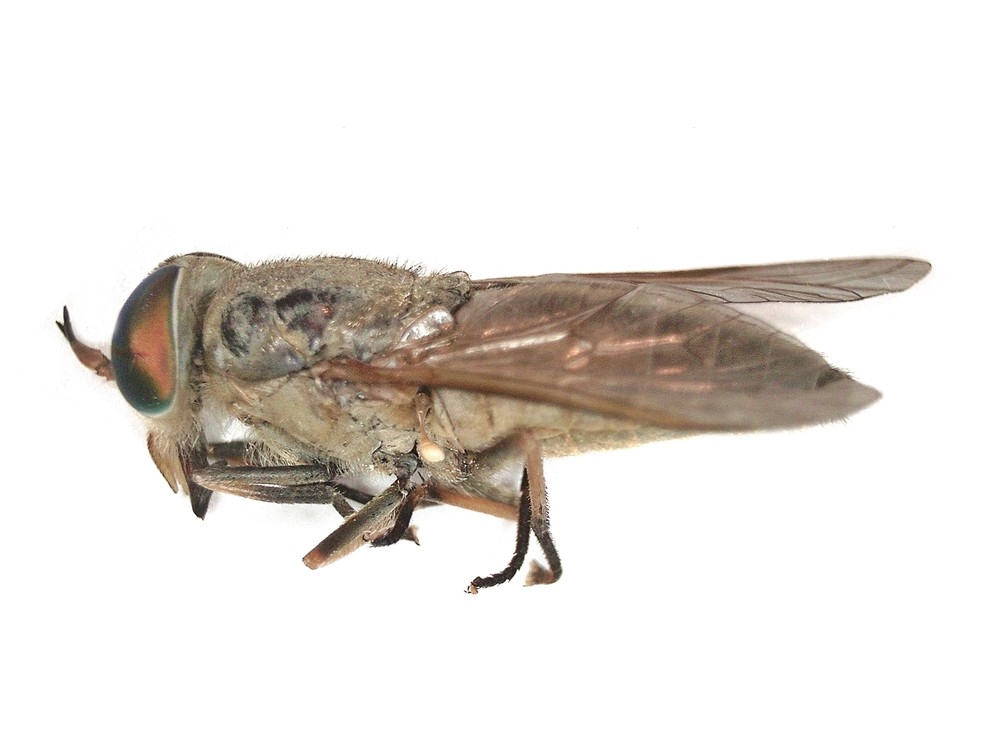
- Tabanus quinquevittatus

Scientific classification
- Kingdom: Animalia
- Phylum: Arthropoda
- Clade: Pancrustacea
- Class: Insecta
- Order: Diptera
- Family: Tabanidae
- Subfamily: Tabaninae
- Tribe: Tabanini
- Genus: Tabanus
- Species: T. quinquevittatus

Binomial name
- Tabanus quinquevittatus Wiedemann, 1821

Synonyms
- Tabanus baltimorensis Macquart, 1855; Tabanus coastalis Wiedemann, 1828; Tabanus manifestus Walker, 1850; Tabanus vicarius Walker, 1848

= Tabanus quinquevittatus =

Species of fly

Tabanus quinquevittatus is a species of horse fly in the family Tabanidae.

== Distribution ==
United States.
