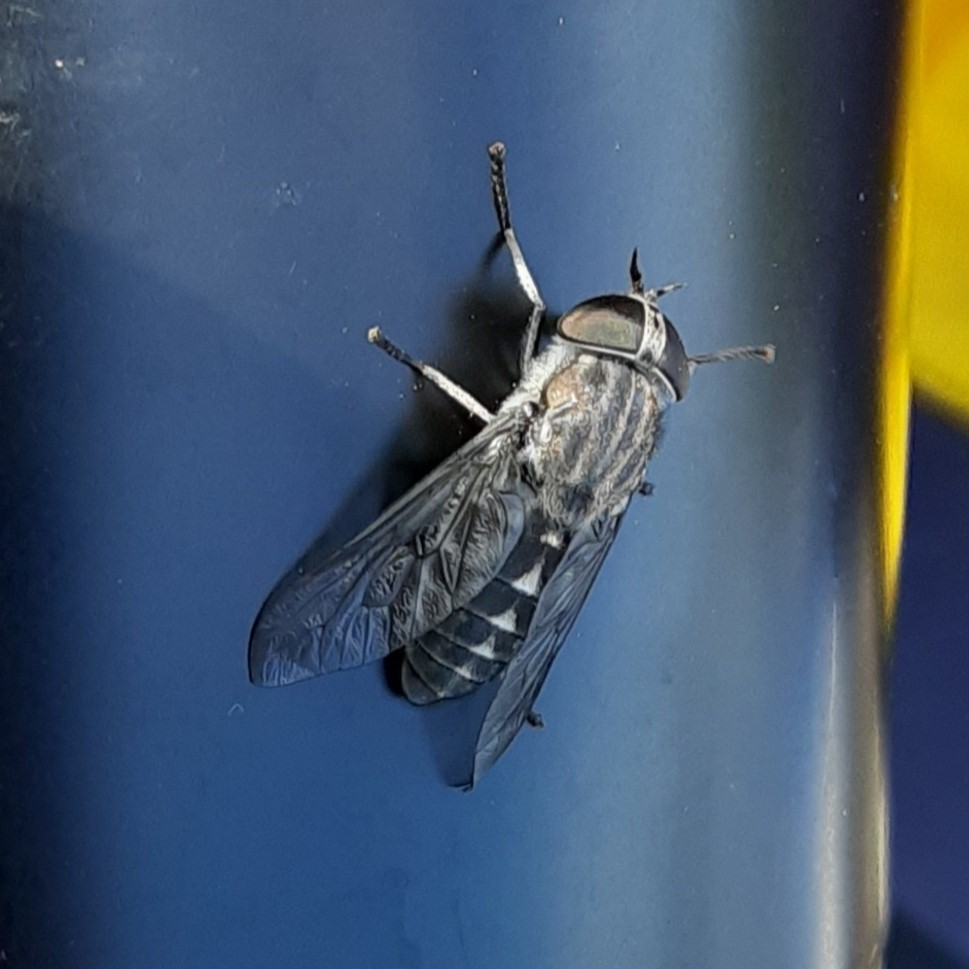
- Female

Scientific classification
- Kingdom: Animalia
- Phylum: Arthropoda
- Clade: Pancrustacea
- Class: Insecta
- Order: Diptera
- Family: Tabanidae
- Subfamily: Tabaninae
- Tribe: Tabanini
- Genus: Tabanus
- Species: T. fairchildi

Binomial name
- Tabanus fairchildi Stone, 1938

= Tabanus fairchildi =

Species of fly

Tabanus fairchildi, Fairchild's horse fly, is a species of horse fly in the family Tabanidae.

== Distribution ==
Canada, United States.
