= Tabanus novaescotiae =

Scientific classification
- Kingdom: Animalia
- Phylum: Arthropoda
- Clade: Pancrustacea
- Class: Insecta
- Order: Diptera
- Family: Tabanidae
- Subfamily: Tabaninae
- Tribe: Tabanini
- Genus: Tabanus
- Species: T. novaescotiae

Binomial name
- Tabanus novaescotiae Macquart, 1847

Synonyms
- Tabanus actaeon Osten Sacken, 1876

Species of fly

Tabanus novaescotiae is a species of Horse-fly in the family Tabanidae.

== Distribution ==
Canada, United States.
