= Tabanus fuscopunctatus =

Scientific classification
- Kingdom: Animalia
- Phylum: Arthropoda
- Clade: Pancrustacea
- Class: Insecta
- Order: Diptera
- Family: Tabanidae
- Subfamily: Tabaninae
- Tribe: Tabanini
- Genus: Tabanus
- Species: T. fuscopunctatus

Binomial name
- Tabanus fuscopunctatus Macquart, 1850

Synonyms
- Tabanus pechumani Philip, 1960

Species of fly

Tabanus fuscopunctatus is a species of horse fly in the family Tabanidae.

== Distribution ==
It can be found in the United States.
