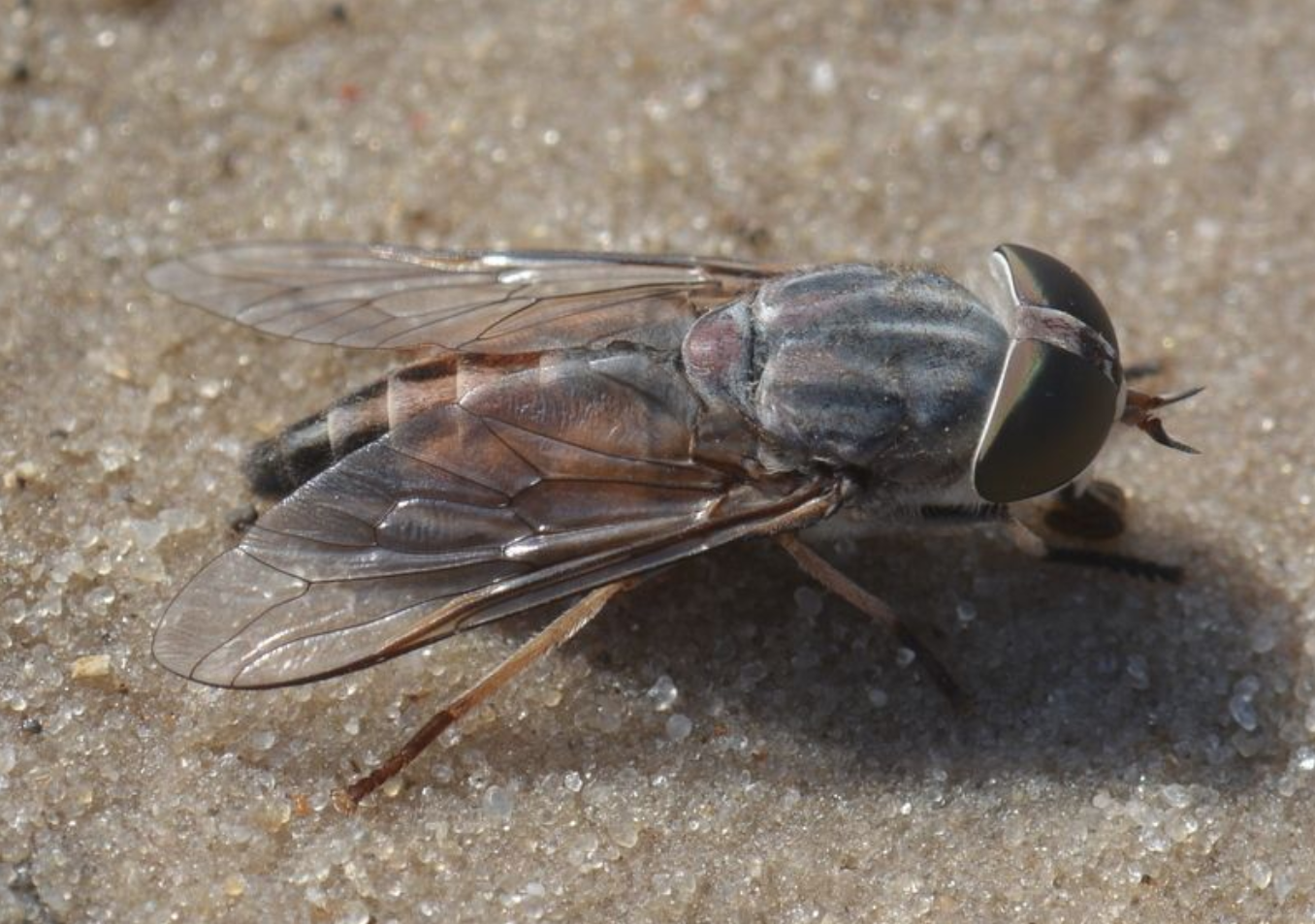

Scientific classification
- Kingdom: Animalia
- Phylum: Arthropoda
- Clade: Pancrustacea
- Class: Insecta
- Order: Diptera
- Family: Tabanidae
- Genus: Tabanus
- Species: T. taeniola

Binomial name
- Tabanus taeniola Palisot de Beauvois (1806)

Synonyms
- Tabanus exclamationis Girard, 1881; Tabanus hirsuta Tendeiro, 1965; Tabanus longitudinalis Loew, 1852; Tabanus macrops Walker, 1848; Tabanus picticeps Becker, 1922; Tabanus proximus Corti, 1895; Tabanus rubicundus Walker, 1848; Tabanus sagittarius Macquart, 1838; Tabanus serratus Loew, 1858; Tabanus socius Walker, 1848; Tabanus subelongatus Macquart, 1846; Tabanus variatus Walker, 1850; Tabanus virgatus Austen, 1906

= Tabanus taeniola =

Species of horse fly

Tabanus taeniola is a species of horse fly in the family Tabanidae.

== Distribution ==
Originally described as Tabanus taeniola in 1806 by Palisot de Beauvois from a specimen collected in Nigeria. Afrotropical and Palearctic, widespread in Africa penetrating the Palearctic to the East Mediterranean coast through Egypt, Cyprus and the Levant eastwards to Saudi Arabia. Regular migrant in the Levant and Cyprus.

== Blood feeding hosts and veterinary relevance ==
Known hosts in Europe and the Levant are horses, donkeys, camels, dogs, and men, in Africa—horses and cattle. In Africa this species is an important vector for Trypanosoma parasites causing the disease called surra. Surra is a major disease in camels, equines, cattle, and dogs, in which it can often be fatal.
