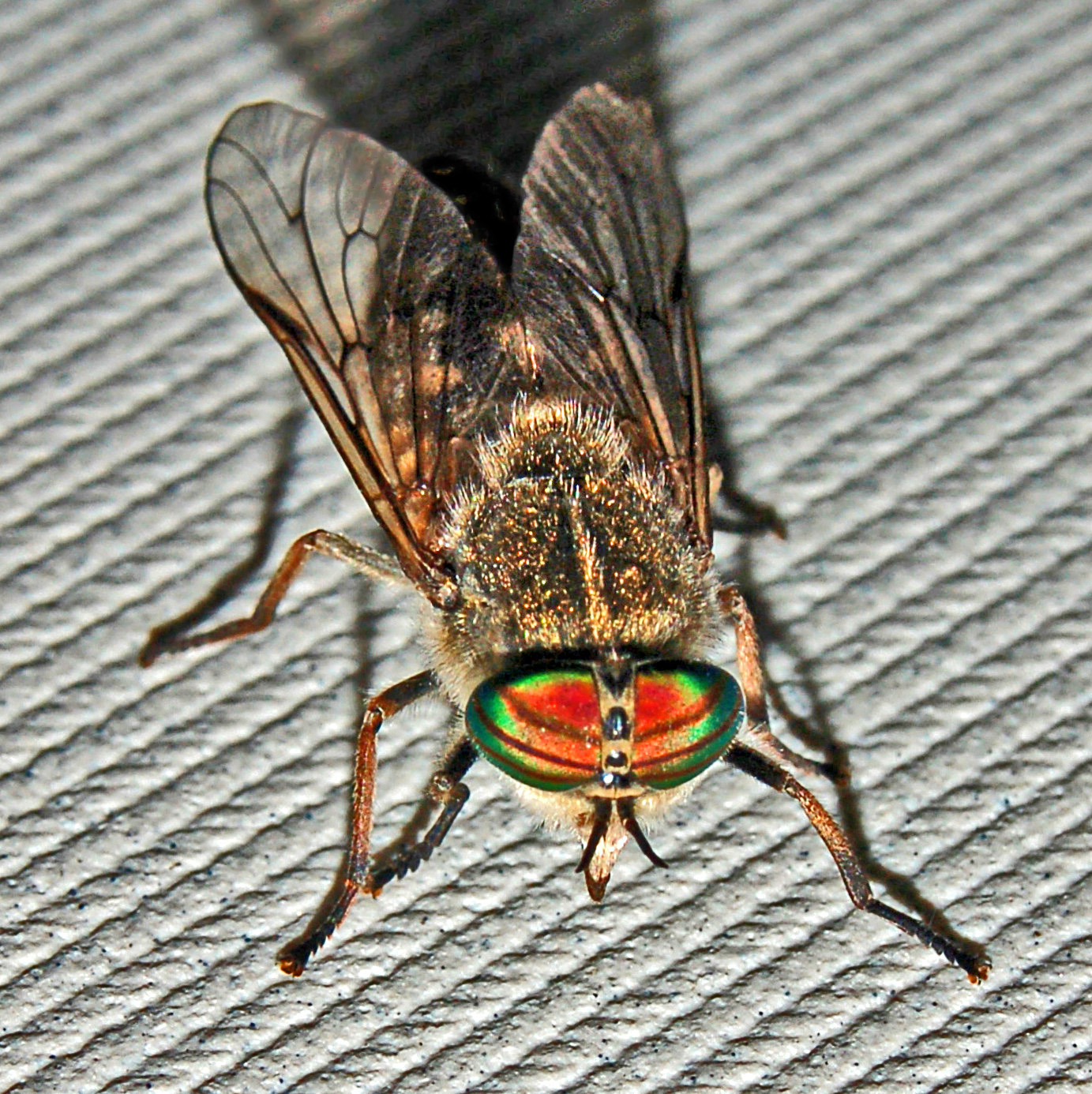
- Female of Tabanus quatuornotatus

Scientific classification
- Kingdom: Animalia
- Phylum: Arthropoda
- Clade: Pancrustacea
- Class: Insecta
- Order: Diptera
- Family: Tabanidae
- Subfamily: Tabaninae
- Tribe: Tabanini
- Genus: Tabanus
- Species: T. quatuornotatus

Binomial name
- Tabanus quatuornotatus Meigen 1820

Synonyms
- Atylotus quatuornotatus var. cherbottae Muschamp, 1939; Dasystypia labaumeanus Enderlein, 1925; Tabanus quatuornotatus ssp. araxis Olsufiev, 1972

= Tabanus quatuornotatus =

Species of fly

Tabanus quatuornotatus is a species of biting horse-fly.

== Description ==
This species is present in most of Europe, in the Near East and in North Africa. In particular, it can be found, as well as in Europe, also in Russia, Transcaucasus, Middle Asia, Morocco, Tunisia, Turkey and in Iran.

== Description ==
Tabanus quatuornotatus can reach a body length of about 15–18 mm. These medium-sized hairy blood-sucking horse-flies shows hairy eyes with three purple eye bands. Antennae are entirely black. Palpi are short and oval, rounded at apex. Moreover frontal callus is squared and dull black. Also the upper part of subcallus is polished black. The abdomen is black and grey coloured.
