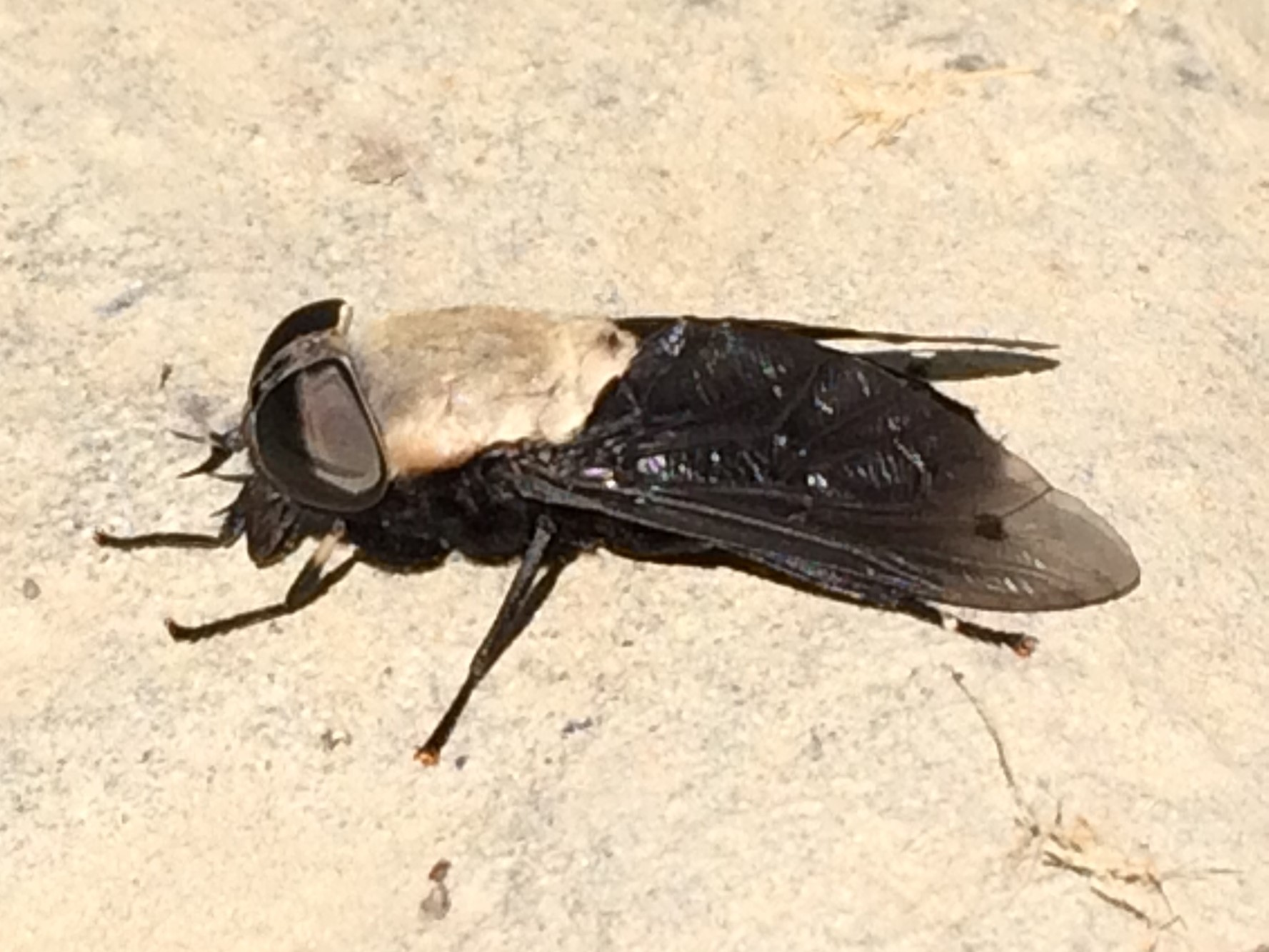

Scientific classification
- Kingdom: Animalia
- Phylum: Arthropoda
- Clade: Pancrustacea
- Class: Insecta
- Order: Diptera
- Family: Tabanidae
- Subfamily: Tabaninae
- Tribe: Tabanini
- Genus: Tabanus
- Species: T. punctifer

Binomial name
- Tabanus punctifer Osten Sacken, 1876

= Tabanus punctifer =

Species of fly

Tabanus punctifer, commonly known as the western horse fly, is a species of horse fly in the family Tabanidae. This species of horse fly is approximately 20.5 mm (0.8 in) long. They are typically found throughout the southern and western parts of the United States. They can be found between Utah and Mexico, and between California and Texas. The thorax is covered with long hairs that give it a creamy white color, while the abdomen is completely black. Much like other horse fly species, the Tabanus punctifer female requires a blood meal for the development of their eggs. Females will bite horses, livestock, and humans, making them vectors of disease for pathogens and parasites.

== Distribution ==
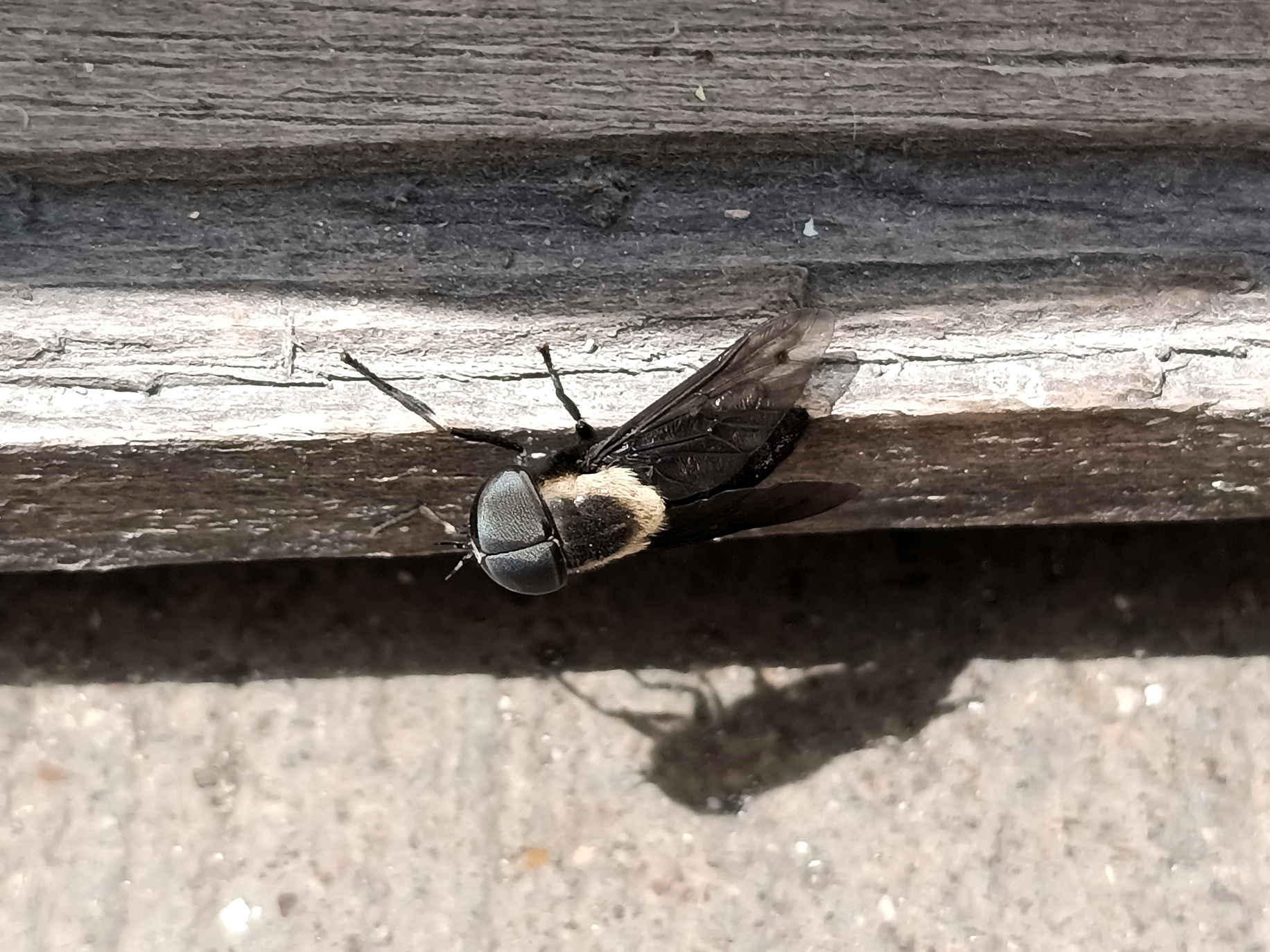
In Mexico

Canada, United States and Mexico.
