= Tabanus nigripes =

Scientific classification
- Kingdom: Animalia
- Phylum: Arthropoda
- Clade: Pancrustacea
- Class: Insecta
- Order: Diptera
- Family: Tabanidae
- Subfamily: Tabaninae
- Tribe: Tabanini
- Genus: Tabanus
- Species: T. nigripes

Binomial name
- Tabanus nigripes Wiedemann, 1821

Synonyms
- Tabanus coffeatus Macquart, 1847; Tabanus winthemi Kröber, 1931

Species of fly

Tabanus nigripes is a species of horse fly in the family Tabanidae.

== Distribution ==
Canada, United States.
