= Tabanus sagax =

Scientific classification
- Kingdom: Animalia
- Phylum: Arthropoda
- Clade: Pancrustacea
- Class: Insecta
- Order: Diptera
- Family: Tabanidae
- Subfamily: Tabaninae
- Tribe: Tabanini
- Genus: Tabanus
- Species: T. sagax

Binomial name
- Tabanus sagax Osten Sacken, 1876

Synonyms
- Atylotus baal Townsend, 1895; Tabanus dawsoni Philip, 1931

Species of fly

Tabanus sagax is a species of horse fly in the family Tabanidae.

== Distribution ==
United States.
