= Tabanus nigrescens =

Scientific classification
- Kingdom: Animalia
- Phylum: Arthropoda
- Clade: Pancrustacea
- Class: Insecta
- Order: Diptera
- Family: Tabanidae
- Subfamily: Tabaninae
- Tribe: Tabanini
- Genus: Tabanus
- Species: T. nigrescens

Binomial name
- Tabanus nigrescens Palisot de Beauvois, 1809

Synonyms
- Tabanus colon Thunberg, 1827

Species of fly

Tabanus nigrescens is a species of horse fly in the family Tabanidae.

== Distribution ==
United States.

== Subspecies ==
These two subspecies belong to the species Tabanus nigrescens:

- Tabanus nigrescens atripennis Stone, 1935
- Tabanus nigrescens nigrescens Palisot de Beauvois, 1809
