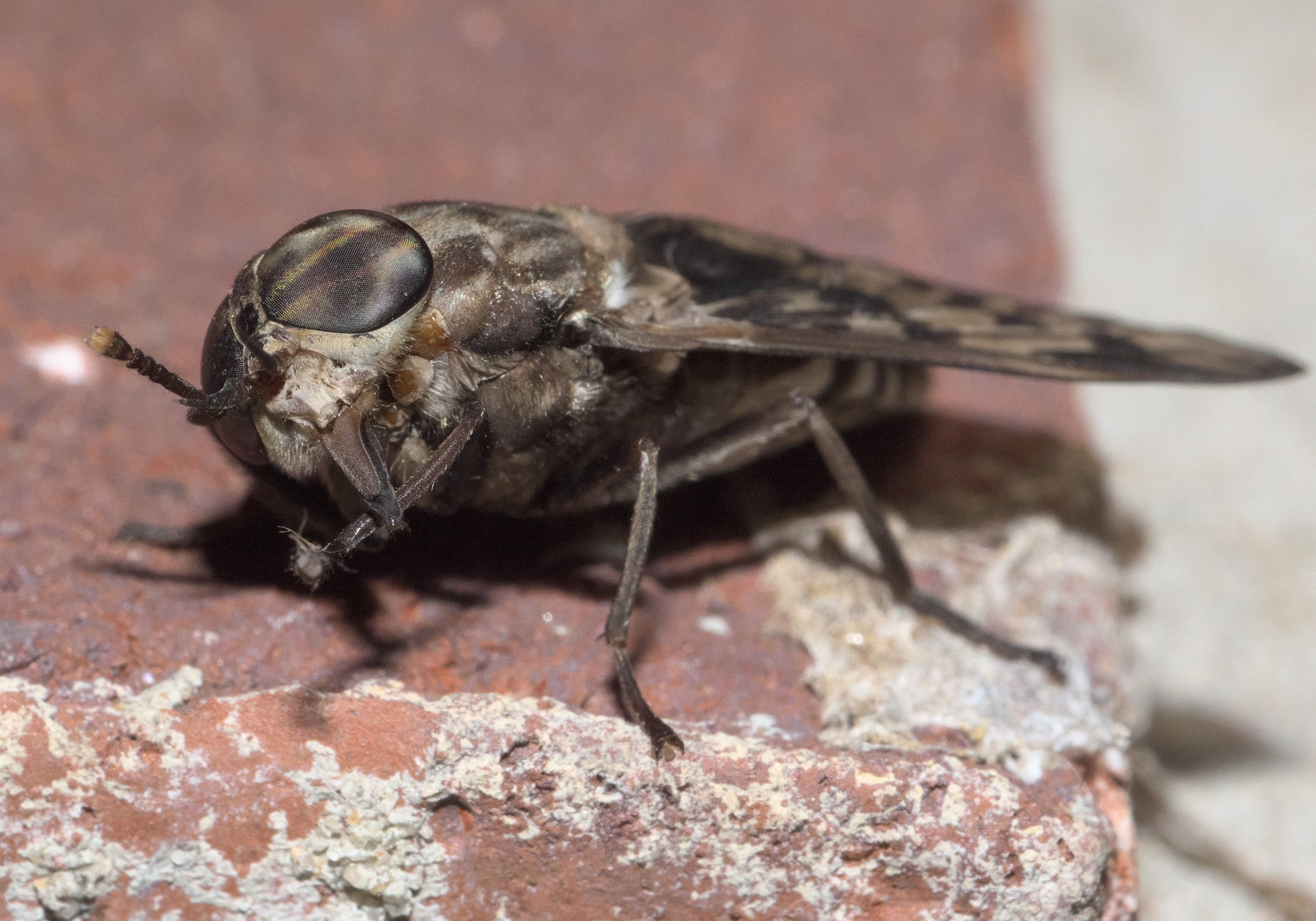

Scientific classification
- Kingdom: Animalia
- Phylum: Arthropoda
- Clade: Pancrustacea
- Class: Insecta
- Order: Diptera
- Family: Tabanidae
- Subfamily: Tabaninae
- Tribe: Tabanini
- Genus: Tabanus
- Species: T. venustus

Binomial name
- Tabanus venustus Osten Sacken, 1876

= Tabanus venustus =

Species of fly

Tabanus venustus is a species of horse fly in the family Tabanidae.

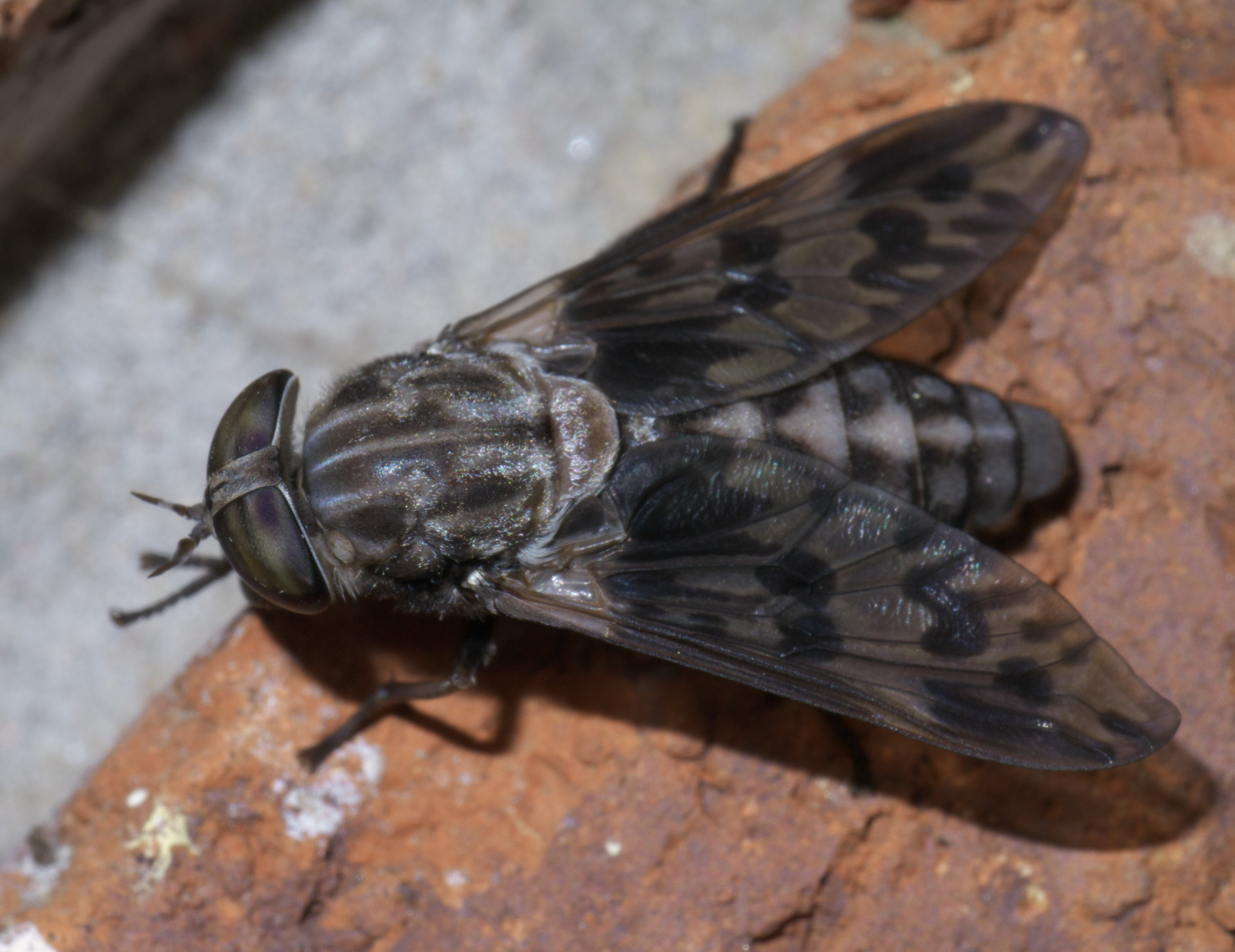

== Distribution ==
United States.
