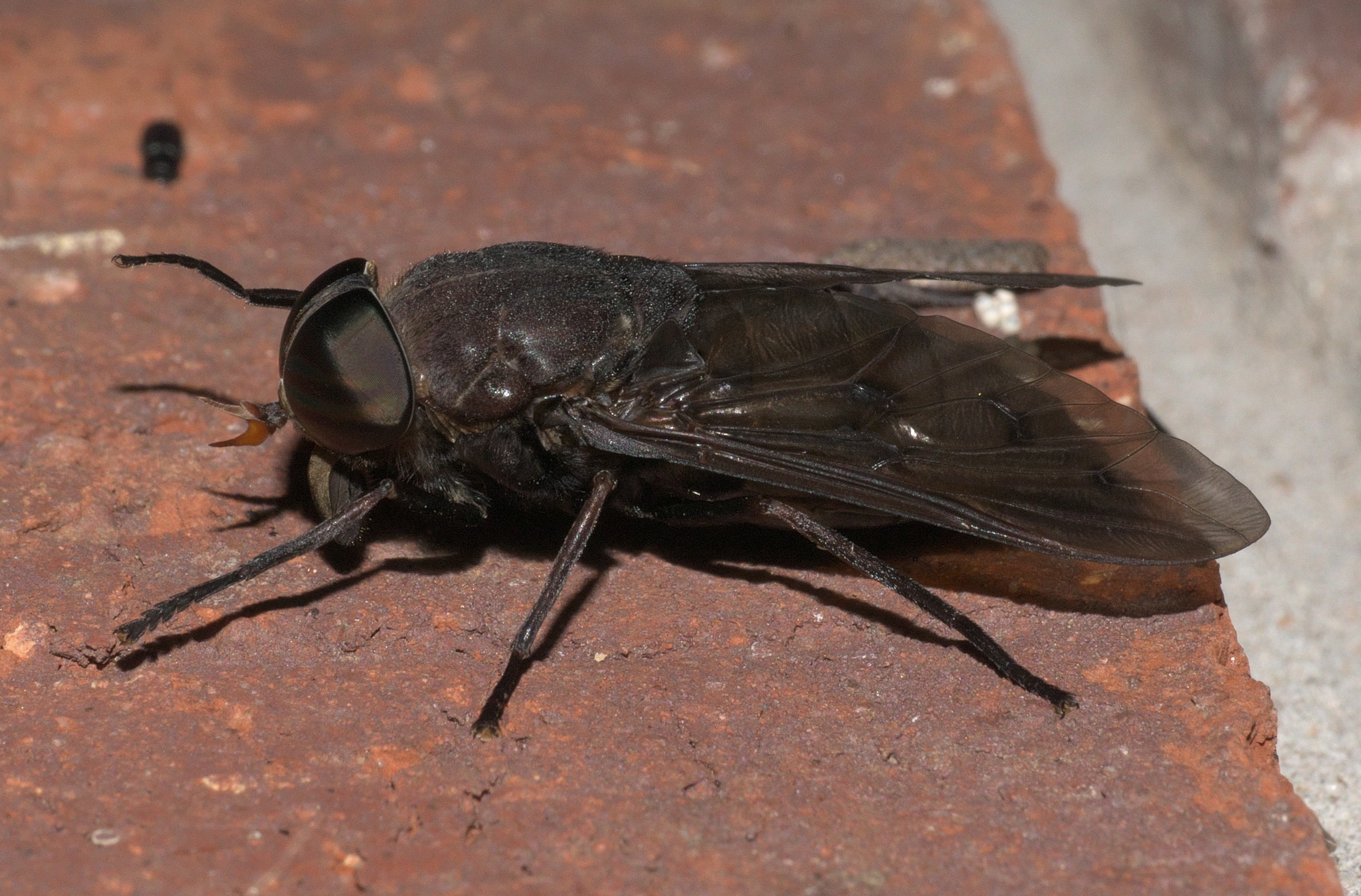
- Tabanus proximus, Oklahoma

Scientific classification
- Kingdom: Animalia
- Phylum: Arthropoda
- Clade: Pancrustacea
- Class: Insecta
- Order: Diptera
- Family: Tabanidae
- Subfamily: Tabaninae
- Tribe: Tabanini
- Genus: Tabanus
- Species: T. proximus

Binomial name
- Tabanus proximus Walker, 1848

Synonyms
- Tabanus benedictus Whitney, 1904

= Tabanus proximus =

Species of fly

Tabanus proximus is a species of horse flies in the family Tabanidae.

== Subspecies ==
- Tabanus proximus benedictus Whitney, 1904
- Tabanus proximus proximus Walker, 1848
