= Tabanus catenatus =

Scientific classification
- Kingdom: Animalia
- Phylum: Arthropoda
- Clade: Pancrustacea
- Class: Insecta
- Order: Diptera
- Family: Tabanidae
- Subfamily: Tabaninae
- Tribe: Tabanini
- Genus: Tabanus
- Species: T. catenatus

Binomial name
- Tabanus catenatus Walker, 1848

Synonyms
- Tabanus orion Osten Sacken, 1876

Species of fly

Tabanus catenatus is a large species of horse fly (19-25 mm) in the family Tabanidae.

== Distribution ==
Eastern United States and southeastern Canada.
