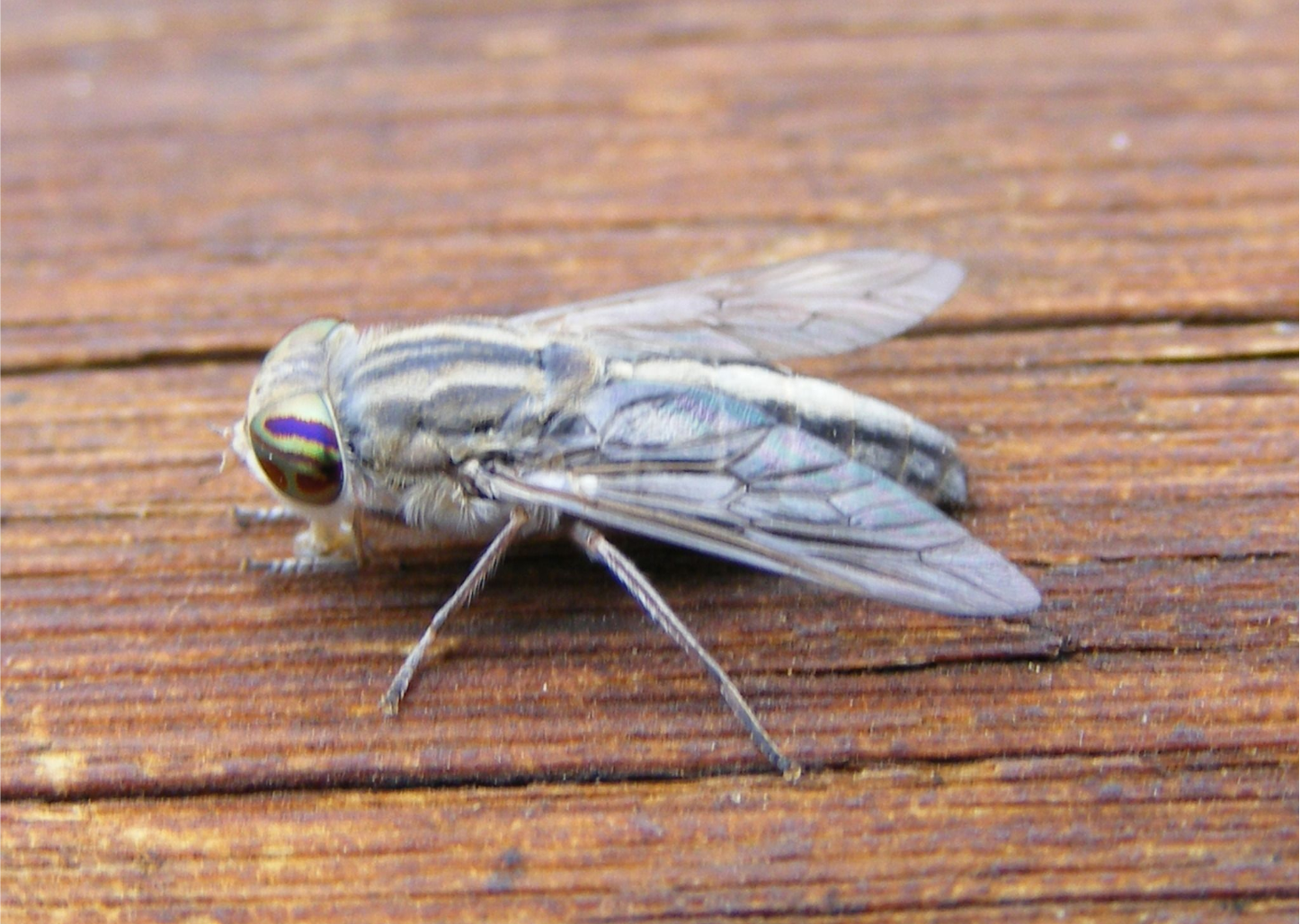

Scientific classification
- Kingdom: Animalia
- Phylum: Arthropoda
- Clade: Pancrustacea
- Class: Insecta
- Order: Diptera
- Family: Tabanidae
- Genus: Tabanus
- Species: T. gratus

Binomial name
- Tabanus gratus Loew, 1858.

Synonyms
- Tabanus tritaeniatus Ricardo, 1908

= Tabanus gratus =

Species of horse fly

Tabanus gratus is a species of horse fly in the family Tabanidae.

== Distribution ==
Originally described as Tabanus gratus in 1858 by Hermann Loew from a female specimen collected in South Africa as Caffraria. Afrotropical and Palearctic species. Widespread in Africa, penetrating the Palearctic realm through the East Mediterranean from Egypt and Cyprus, through Western Saudi Arabia and the Levant to Iran and Afghanistan.

== Blood feeding hosts and veterinary relevance ==
Known hosts in Europe and the Levant are horses and camels, in Africa—horses and cattle. In Africa this species is an important vector for Trypanosoma parasites causing the disease surra. Surra is a major disease in camels, equines, cattle and dogs, in which it can often be fatal.
