= Tabanus laticornis =

Scientific classification
- Kingdom: Animalia
- Phylum: Arthropoda
- Clade: Pancrustacea
- Class: Insecta
- Order: Diptera
- Family: Tabanidae
- Subfamily: Tabaninae
- Tribe: Tabanini
- Genus: Tabanus
- Species: T. laticornis

Binomial name
- Tabanus laticornis Hine, 1904

Species of fly

Tabanus laticornis is a species of horse fly in the family Tabanidae.

== Distribution ==
United States, Mexico.
