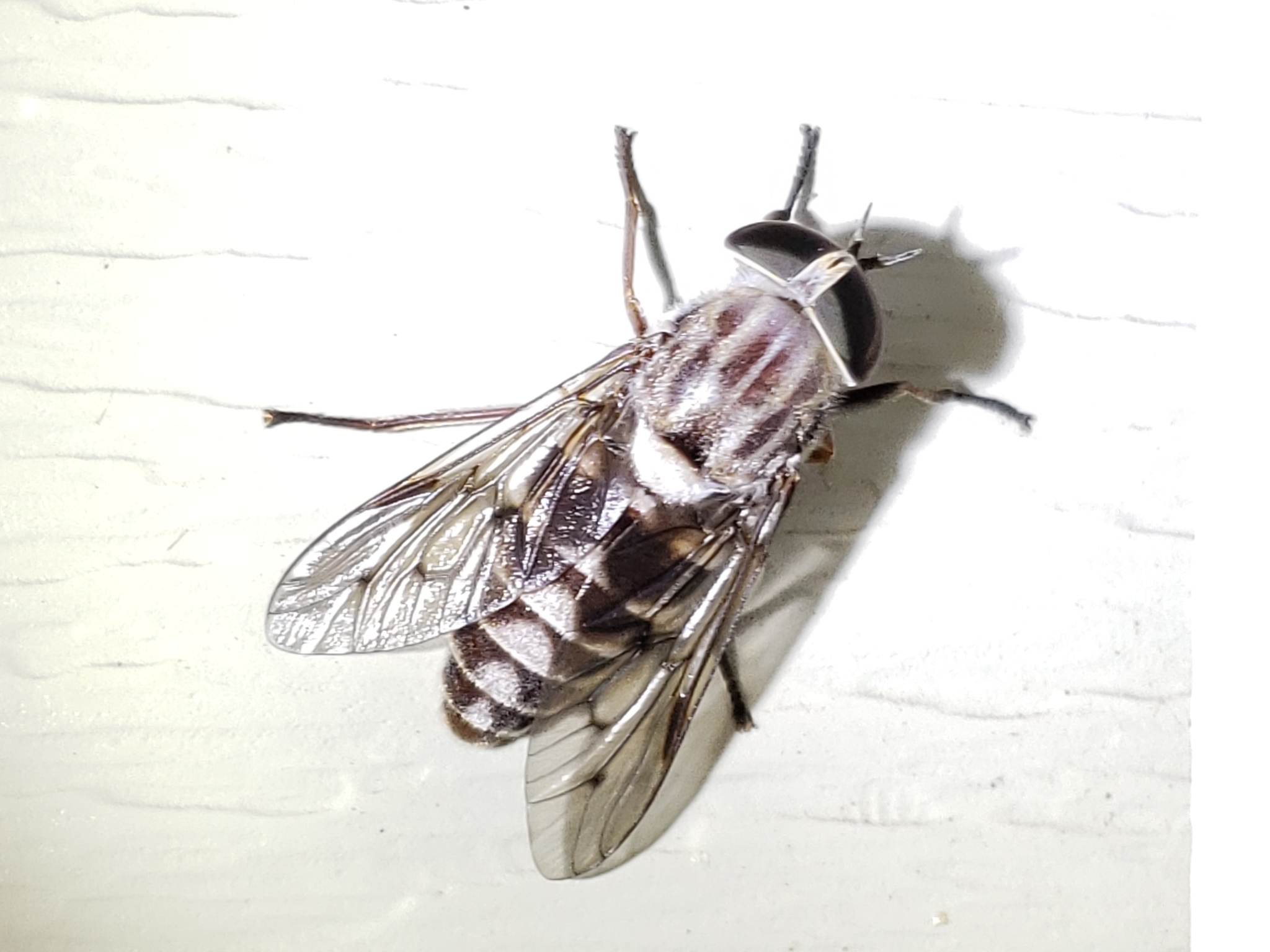

Scientific classification
- Kingdom: Animalia
- Phylum: Arthropoda
- Clade: Pancrustacea
- Class: Insecta
- Order: Diptera
- Family: Tabanidae
- Subfamily: Tabaninae
- Tribe: Tabanini
- Genus: Tabanus
- Species: T. molestus

Binomial name
- Tabanus molestus Say, 1823

Synonyms
- Atylotus tenessensis Bigot, 1892; Tabanus mixis Philip, 1950

= Tabanus molestus =

Species of fly

Tabanus molestus is a species of horse fly in the family Tabanidae.

== Distribution ==
United States.
