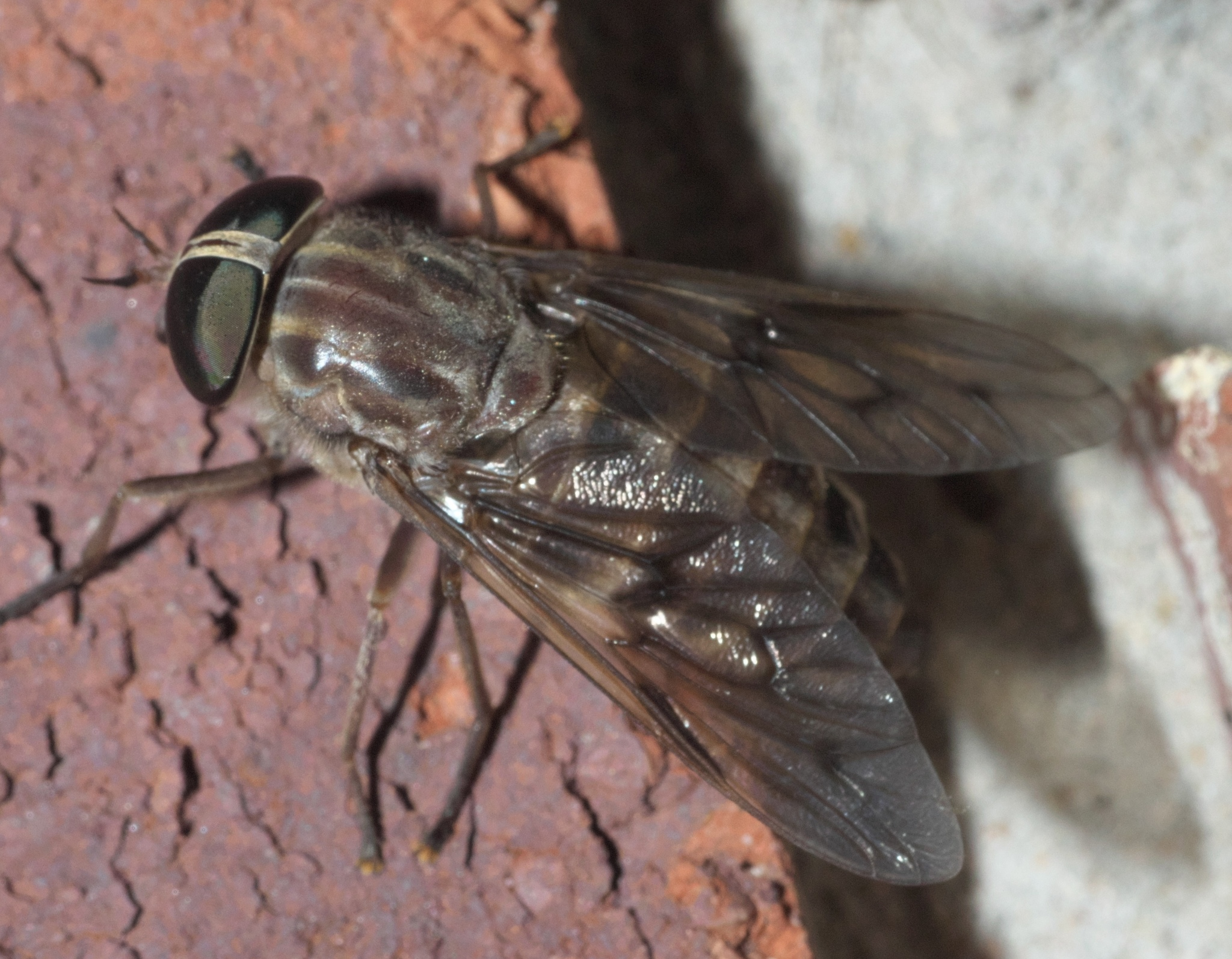
- Tabanus equalis, Oklahoma

Scientific classification
- Kingdom: Animalia
- Phylum: Arthropoda
- Clade: Pancrustacea
- Class: Insecta
- Order: Diptera
- Family: Tabanidae
- Subfamily: Tabaninae
- Tribe: Tabanini
- Genus: Tabanus
- Species: T. equalis

Binomial name
- Tabanus equalis Hine, 1923

Synonyms
- Tabanus uniformis Hine, 1917

= Tabanus equalis =

Species of fly

Tabanus equalis is a species of horse fly in the family Tabanidae.

== Distribution ==
United States.
