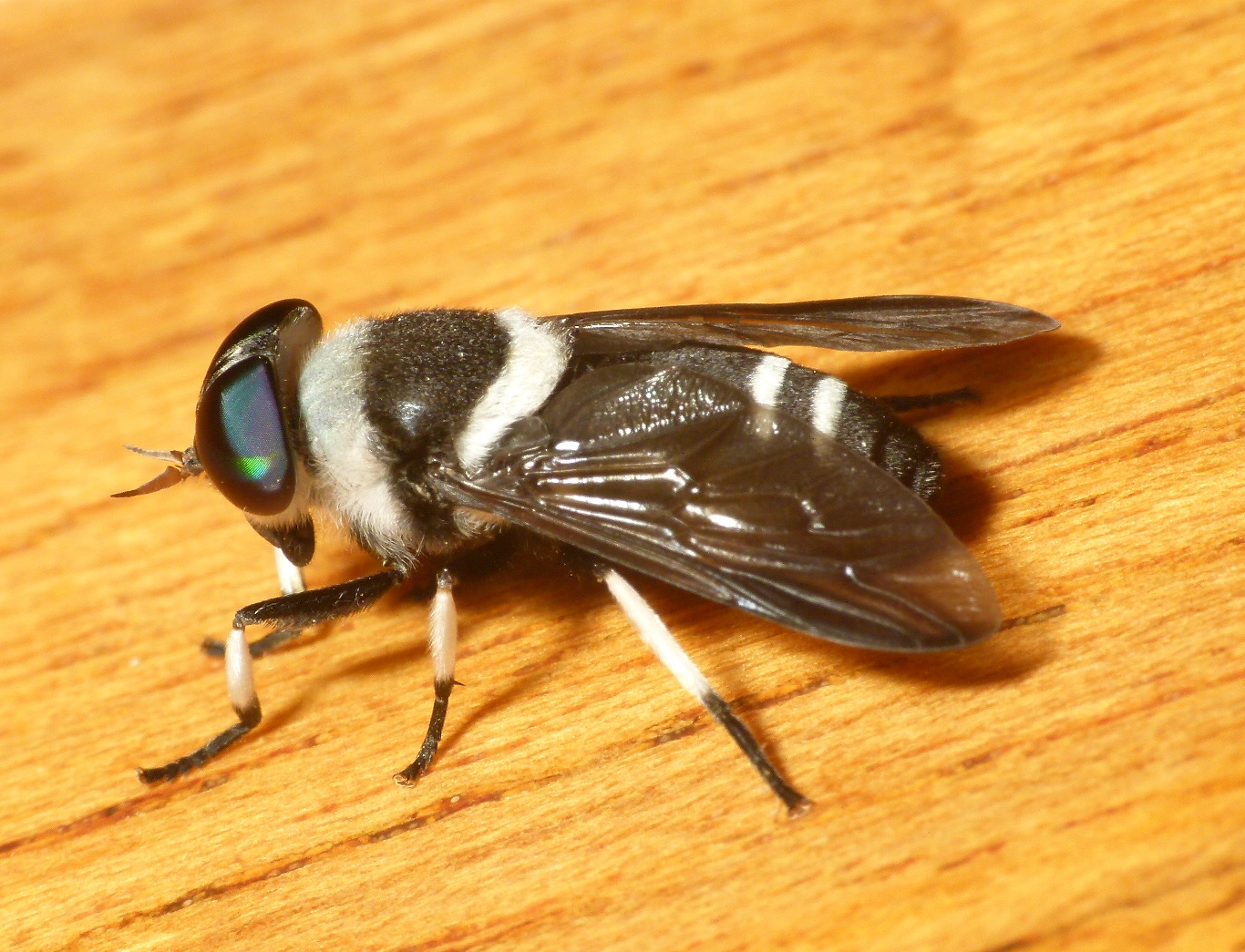
- From the Western Ghats

Scientific classification
- Kingdom: Animalia
- Phylum: Arthropoda
- Clade: Pancrustacea
- Class: Insecta
- Order: Diptera
- Family: Tabanidae
- Genus: Tabanus
- Species: T. biannularis

Binomial name
- Tabanus biannularis Philip, 1960

= Tabanus biannularis =

Species of fly

Tabanus biannularis is a species of horsefly found in Asia from India to Vietnam. The prescutellum, the scutellum, and two bands on the abdomen are white in contrast to an overall black colour. The eyes have a green band running on them.

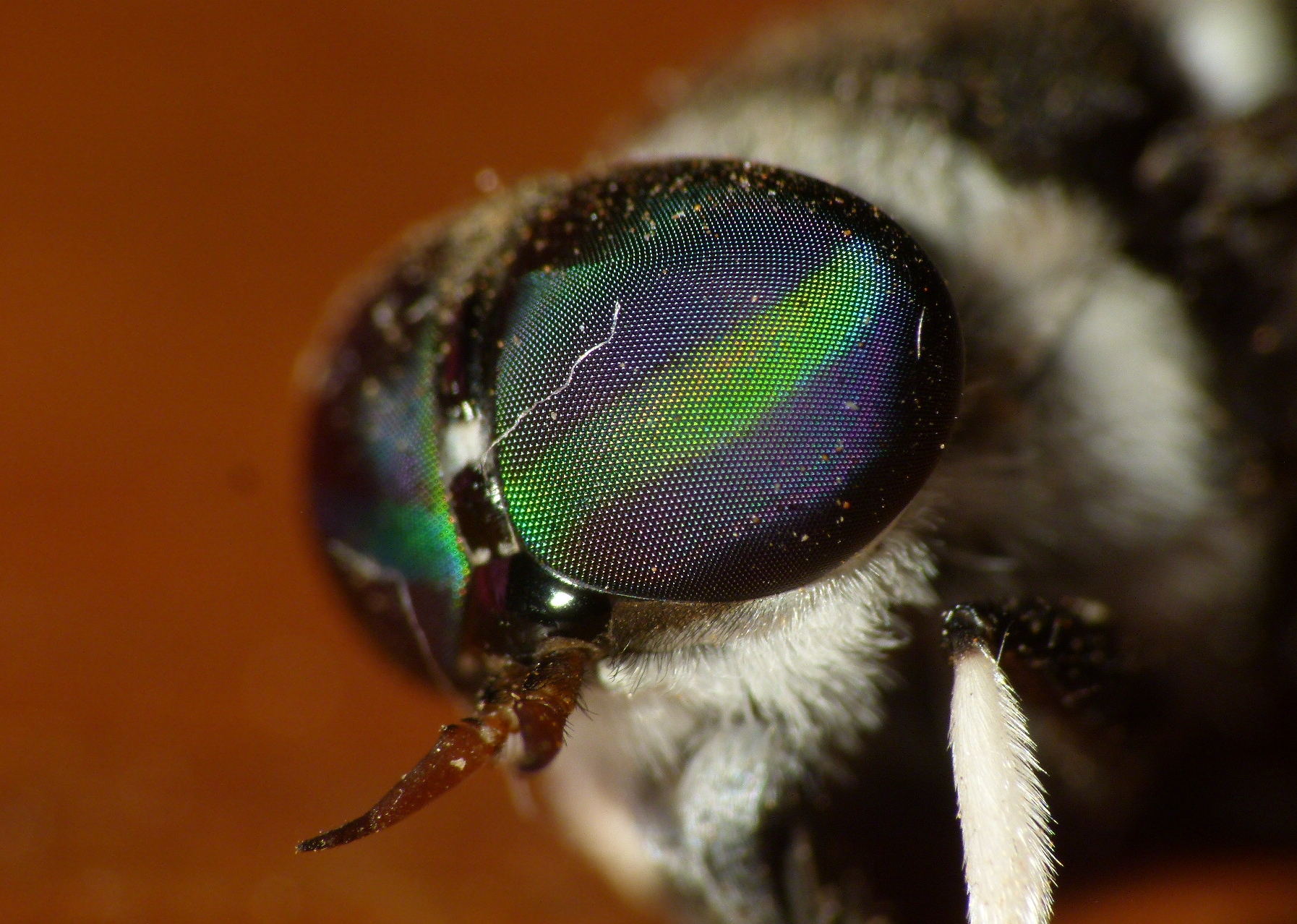
Close view of head

In India, they are found to be particularly active just before the monsoon season.
