= Tabanus darimonti =

Scientific classification
- Kingdom: Animalia
- Phylum: Arthropoda
- Clade: Pancrustacea
- Class: Insecta
- Order: Diptera
- Family: Tabanidae
- Subfamily: Tabaninae
- Tribe: Tabanini
- Genus: Tabanus
- Species: T. darimonti

Binomial name
- Tabanus darimonti Leclercq, 1964

Species of fly

Tabanus darimonti is a Mediterranean species of biting horse-fly. Only female specimens are known.

== Distribution ==
This species is known only from Portugal, Spain, Morocco, Croatia, Herzegovina and Turkey.
