= Tabanus fusconervosus =

Scientific classification
- Kingdom: Animalia
- Phylum: Arthropoda
- Clade: Pancrustacea
- Class: Insecta
- Order: Diptera
- Family: Tabanidae
- Subfamily: Tabaninae
- Tribe: Tabanini
- Genus: Tabanus
- Species: T. fusconervosus

Binomial name
- Tabanus fusconervosus Macquart, 1838

Synonyms
- Tabanus confusus Walker, 1848; Tabanus fur Williston, 1887; Tabanus recedens Walker, 1848

Species of fly

Tabanus fusconervosus is a horse fly in the subfamily Tabaninae ("horse flies"), in the order Diptera ("flies").

== Distribution ==
United States.
