= Tabanus marginalis =

Scientific classification
- Kingdom: Animalia
- Phylum: Arthropoda
- Clade: Pancrustacea
- Class: Insecta
- Order: Diptera
- Family: Tabanidae
- Subfamily: Tabaninae
- Tribe: Tabanini
- Genus: Tabanus
- Species: T. marginalis

Binomial name
- Tabanus marginalis Fabricius, 1805

Synonyms
- Tabanus nivosus Osten Sacken, 1876

Species of fly

Tabanus marginalis is a species of horse fly in the family Tabanidae.

== Distribution ==
Canada, United States.
