= SKIDA1 =

Protein-coding gene in humans

Identifiers
- Aliases: SKIDA1, C10orf140, DLN-1, SKI/DACH domain containing 1
- External IDs: MGI: 1919918; GeneCards: SKIDA1

Gene location (Human)
Chr.	Chromosome 10 (human)
Band	10p12.31	Start	21,513,475 bp
Band	10p12.31	End	21,526,368 bp

Gene location (Mouse)
Chr.	Chromosome 2 (mouse)
Band	2|2 A3	Start	18,045,487 bp
Band	2|2 A3	End	18,053,862 bp
RNA expression pattern
Bgee	Human / Mouse (ortholog); Top expressed in: endothelial cell; ganglionic eminence; testicle; gonad; Brodmann area 23; buccal mucosa cell; ventricular zone; middle temporal gyrus; primary visual cortex; right lobe of thyroid gland / Top expressed in: neural layer of retina; ventricular zone; genital tubercle; Rostral migratory stream; ganglionic eminence; right kidney; neural tube; embryo; yolk sac; embryo; More reference expression data
BioGPS	n/a
Orthologs
Databases	NCBI: entry; OMA: entry
Species	Human	Mouse
Entrez	387640	72668
Ensembl	ENSG00000180592	ENSMUSG00000054074
UniProt	Q1XH10	Q80YR3
RefSeq (mRNA)	NM_207371	NM_028317
RefSeq (protein)	NP_997254	NP_082593
Location (UCSC)	Chr 10: 21.51 – 21.53 Mb	Chr 2: 18.05 – 18.05 Mb
PubMed search
- Wikidata
View/Edit Human	View/Edit Mouse

Ski/Dach domain-containing protein 1 is a protein that in humans is encoded by the SKIDA1 gene. It is also known as C10orf140 and DLN-1. It has orthologs in vertebrates. It has two domains: the Ski/Sno/Dac domain and a domain of unknown function, DUF4854. It is associated with multiple types of cancer, like leukemia, ovarian cancer, and colon cancer. It is predicted to be a nuclear protein. It may interact with PRC2.

== Homologs ==
=== Orthologs ===
SKIDA1 has orthologs in vertebrate species. The species least related to humans with a SKIDA1 ortholog is the lancelet Branchiostoma belcheri. The clades Amphibia and Chondrichthyes have at least two species with SKIDA1, but SKIDA1 is not found throughout the clades. No orthologs have been found in lungfish or invertebrate species.

=== Paralogous domains ===
SKIDA1 shares the Ski/Sno/Dac domain with Ski oncogene (Ski), Ski-like protein (Sno), and dachshund (Dac). It shares DUF4584 with Elongin BC Polycomb Repressive Complex 2 associated Protein (EPOP).

== Structure ==
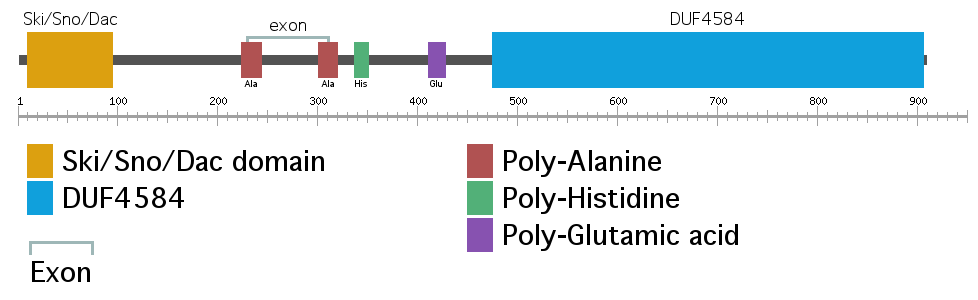
Diagram of the SKIDA1 protein.

In humans, SKIDA1 is located on the reverse strand of chromosome 10 at locus 10p12.31. It contains five exons.

=== Isoforms ===
There is not a consensus on whether humans have one or two SKIDA1 isoforms. NCBI Gene claims there is one, while UniProt claims there are two. It is possible isoform 2 is recorded in NCBI Gene as DLN-1 (accession BAE93016.1). Isoform 1 is 908 amino acids long, while isoform 2 is 827 amino acids long; isoform 2 is missing amino acids 240-318 from isoform 1. Isoform 1 is predicted to weigh 98 kDa and have an isoelectric point of 8.7, while isoform 2 is predicted to weigh 90 kDa and have an isoelectric point of 7.6.

Other mammalian species also have multiple isoforms of SKIDA1, including carnivorans, rodents, and primates. The number of isoforms each species has varies: cheetahs have five recorded isoforms, chimpanzees have three recorded, and brown rats have two recorded.

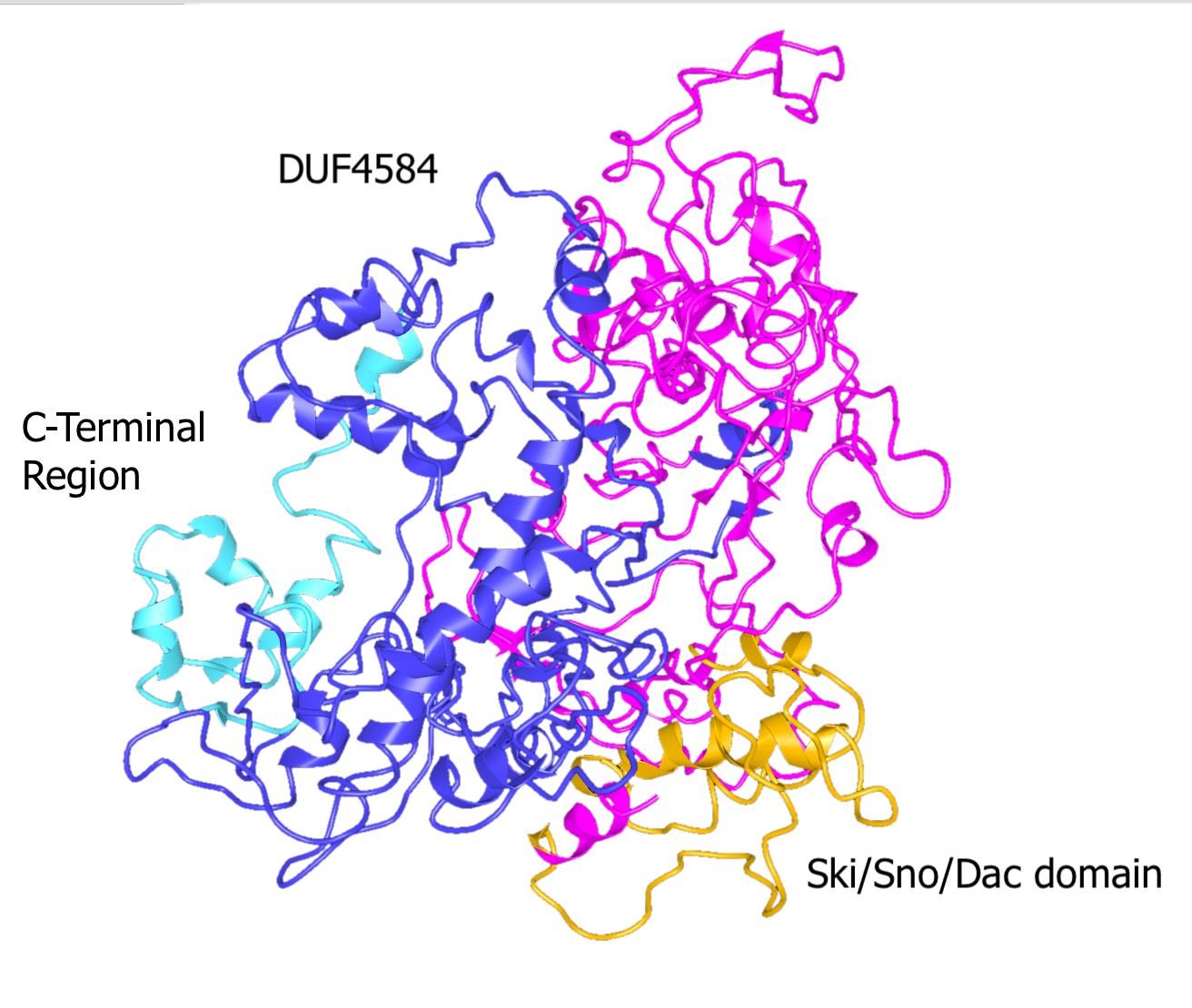
A predicted 3D structure of SKIDA1. The Ski/Sno/Dac domain, DUF4584, and C-Terminal region (amino acids 844-908) are annotated.

=== Amino acid repeats ===
Human SKIDA1 contains two poly-alanine regions, one poly-histidine region, and one poly-glutamic acid region. It is unknown if they have any function. The poly-alanine and poly-histidine regions are not highly conserved among orthologs; for example, while they are found in the house mouse ortholog, they are not found in the western lowland gorilla ortholog. The poly-glutamic acid region shows more conservation, and is found abbreviated in species as distantly related from humans as the tire track eel.

=== Domains ===
SKIDA1 contains two domains: Ski/Sno/Dac and DUF4854. The Ski/Sno/Dac domain is at the N-terminus end of the protein. The Ski/Sno/Dac domain is also found in the proteins Ski, Ski-like protein, and dachshund. It is potentially a DNA-binding domain.

The other domain, DUF4854, is also found in EPOP, near its C-terminus. However, the DUF4584 found in EPOP is roughly a fifth the size of that in SKIDA1. The C-termini of SKIDA1 (amino acids 844–908) and EPOP (amino acids 313–379) have 52% identity. The C-terminus of EPOP binds to the SUZ12 subunit of Polycomb Repressive Complex 2 (PRC2), suggesting that of SKIDA1 may as well.

== Regulation ==
=== Promoter and transcription factors ===
In humans, there are five predicted potential promoters. Two align with the second half of the mRNA transcript, suggesting they are not used or only produce an incomplete polypeptide.

The promoter that aligns best with the start of the mRNA transcript is potentially bound to by many transcription factors, including Transcription factor II B, Nuclear factor Y, Early growth response 1, and Krueppel-like factor 6. It does not contain a TATA box.

=== Transcript regulation ===
SKIDA1 is regulated by microRNAs. miR-93 binds to the SKIDA1 3'-UTR. Multiple microRNAs are predicted to bind to the SKIDA1 3'-UTR, including miR-130, miR-301, miR-454, and miR-494.

=== Polypeptide modification ===
SKIDA1 is SUMOylated at five sites. Additional sites are predicted to be SUMOylated. SKIDA1 is also predicted to be phosphorylated and O-GlcNAcylated.

== Expression ==
=== Subcellular localization ===
SKIDA1 is predicted to be localized primarily in the nucleus and less so in the cytosol.

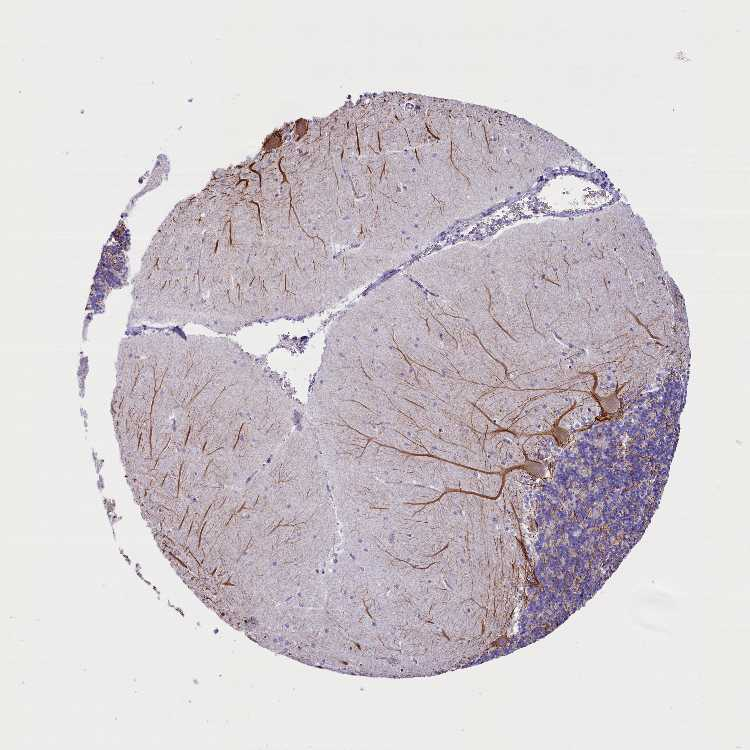
SKIDA1 is highly expressed in Purkinje cells in the cerebellum.

=== Tissue expression ===
SKIDA1 is expressed at high levels in the brain, thyroid, and testes. It is expressed at medium to low levels in adipose tissue, lymph nodes, and skeletal muscle. In mice, it is noted to have medium-to-high expression in the olfactory bulb, retina, and salivary gland.

=== Developmental expression ===
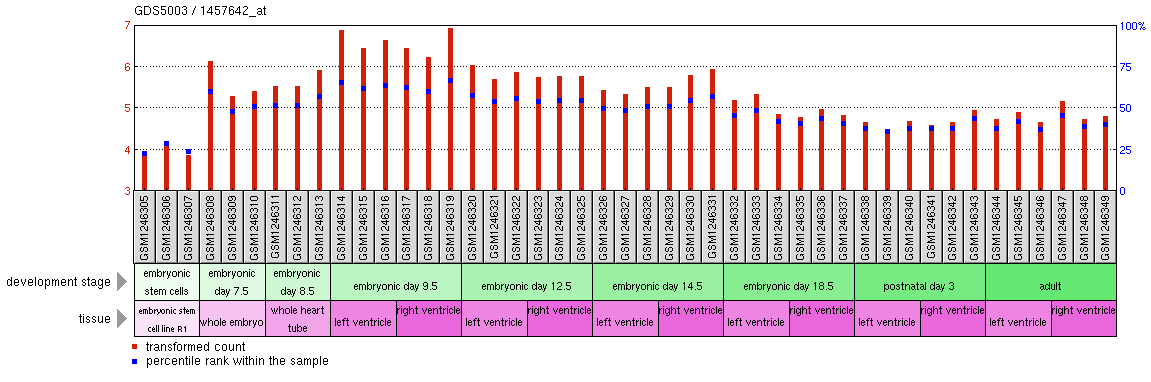
Expression of SKIDA1 in the house mouse fetal heart increases, then decreases with age.

SKIDA1 expression changes during organism development. Expression is low in the zygote, peaks during embryonic development, and is low post-birth. In the house mouse, it is expressed most during organogenesis. In the fetus, its expression is low in the liver but not other organs. Expression in the adult liver is much higher. In contrast, SKIDA1 expression in the fetal brain is higher than in the adult brain.

SKIDA1 in the African clawed frog is expressed faintly in the marginal zone of gastrulae. During neurulation, it is expressed in the brain and cranial neural crest. During tailbud, SKIDA1 expression increases in sensory placodes. By the end of tailbud, neural expression has faded except in the olfactory organ.

== Function ==
SKIDA1 is predicted to function primarily in the nucleus and also in the cytosol.

SKIDA1 knockouts in mice have significant differences from wild-type mice in the skeletal, neurological, reproductive, and immune systems. Other significant differences include effected hearing, an enlarged thymus, and increased pre-weaning mortality. Some, but not all, of these effects were found in heterozygous knockouts.

== Clinical significance ==
SKIDA1 expression is associated with multiple types of cancer. It is over-expressed in epithelial ovarian cancer cells. Its expression is altered by various cancer-treatment compounds: human alpha-lactalbumin made lethal to tumor cells; oleate salts; metformin; and aspirin. In cell lines of cancerous cells, altered expression is associated with resistance to dasatinib and docetaxel, which are used to treat cancer.

Altered methylation of SKIDA1 is associated with human pancreatic cancer, rheumatoid arthritis, and lupus erythematosus. Additionally, SKIDA1 is expressed less in women with Down syndrome compared to their identical twins without Down syndrome. Its expression is dramatically reduced in brains affected by untreated HIV1-associated neurocognitive disorders (HAND) in comparison to healthy brains and brains affected by HAND but treated with antiretrovirals.
