= Dachshund (disambiguation) =

A dachshund is a short-legged, long-bodied, hound-type dog breed.

Dachshund may also refer to:

- Dachshund (building), a building in Warsaw, Poland
- Dachshund (gene)
- Miniature Dachshund, a miniature version of the previously mentioned dog breed
- Dachshund racing, a form of dog racing
