= EPOP =

EPOP or Epop may refer to:

- Employment-to-population ratio
- Egalitarian price of proportionality, a component of the egalitarian price of fairness
- Elongin BC Polycomb Repressive Complex 2 Associated Protein, a protein sharing a domain with SKIDA1
- Electropop, a music genre
