= SKI protein =

Protein found in humans

SKI
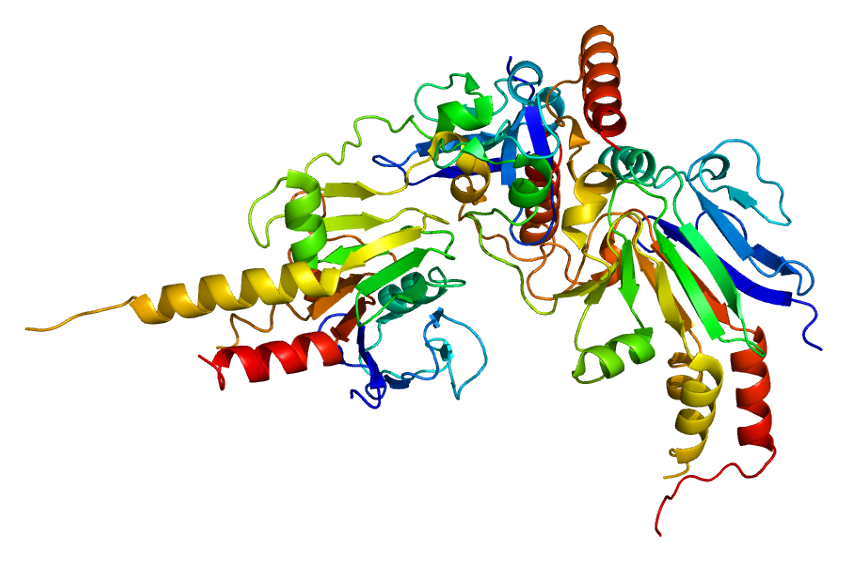

Identifiers
- Aliases: SKI, SKI proto-oncogene, SGS, SKV
- External IDs: OMIM: 164780; MGI: 98310; GeneCards: SKI
Available structures
PDB	Ortholog search: PDBe RCSB
PDB	List of PDB id codes 1MR1, 1SBX

Gene location (Human)
Chr.	Chromosome 1 (human)
Band	1p36.33-p36.32	Start	2,228,319 bp
Band	1p36.33-p36.32	End	2,310,213 bp

Gene location (Mouse)
Chr.	Chromosome 4 (mouse)
Band	4 E2|4 86.17 cM	Start	155,238,532 bp
Band	4 E2|4 86.17 cM	End	155,307,049 bp
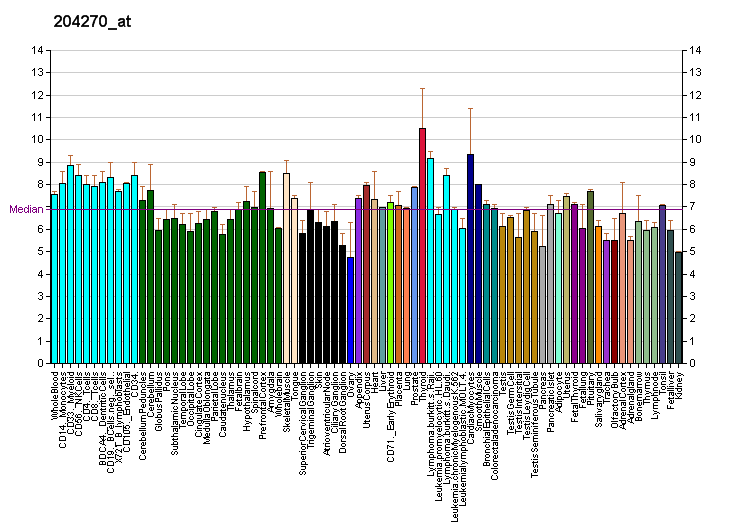
RNA expression pattern
Bgee	Human / Mouse (ortholog); Top expressed in: nipple; right hemisphere of cerebellum; urethra; decidua; Descending thoracic aorta; popliteal artery; tibial arteries; sural nerve; ascending aorta; lower lobe of lung / Top expressed in: ascending aorta; aortic valve; primary oocyte; secondary oocyte; zygote; ankle; Rostral migratory stream; vas deferens; efferent ductule; molar; More reference expression data
BioGPS	More reference expression data
Gene ontology
Molecular function	transcription corepressor activity; protein domain specific binding; histone deacetylase inhibitor activity; zinc ion binding; protein binding; SMAD binding; protein kinase binding; ubiquitin protein ligase binding; DNA-binding transcription factor activity, RNA polymerase II-specific
Cellular component	PML body; centrosome; nuclear body; nucleus; nucleoplasm; transcription regulator complex; cytoplasm; transcription repressor complex; protein-containing complex
Biological process	roof of mouth development; myotube differentiation; SMAD protein signal transduction; somatic stem cell population maintenance; nose morphogenesis; cell motility; bone morphogenesis; negative regulation of transcription by RNA polymerase II; negative regulation of transforming growth factor beta receptor signaling pathway; BMP signaling pathway; negative regulation of osteoblast differentiation; myelination in peripheral nervous system; protein homotrimerization; negative regulation of BMP signaling pathway; positive regulation of Wnt signaling pathway; negative regulation of activin receptor signaling pathway; neural tube closure; lens morphogenesis in camera-type eye; embryonic limb morphogenesis; skeletal muscle fiber development; retina development in camera-type eye; camera-type eye development; positive regulation of DNA binding; olfactory bulb development; cell population proliferation; anterior/posterior axis specification; negative regulation of fibroblast proliferation; face morphogenesis; camera-type eye morphogenesis; negative regulation of Schwann cell proliferation; negative regulation of cell population proliferation; positive regulation of transcription by RNA polymerase II; transcription, DNA-templated; negative regulation of histone deacetylation; neuron development; transforming growth factor beta receptor signaling pathway; negative regulation of cell differentiation
Sources:Amigo / QuickGO
Orthologs
Databases	NCBI: entry; OMA: entry
Species	Human	Mouse
Entrez	6497	20481
Ensembl	ENSG00000157933	ENSMUSG00000029050
UniProt	P12755	Q60698
RefSeq (mRNA)	NM_003036	NM_011385; NM_001357191
RefSeq (protein)	NP_003027	n/a
Location (UCSC)	Chr 1: 2.23 – 2.31 Mb	Chr 4: 155.24 – 155.31 Mb
PubMed search
- Wikidata
View/Edit Human	View/Edit Mouse

The SKI protein is a nuclear proto-oncogene that is associated with tumors at high cellular concentrations. SKI has been shown to interfere with normal cellular functioning by both directly impeding expression of certain genes inside the nucleus of the cell as well as disrupting signaling proteins that activate genes.

SKI negatively regulates transforming growth factor-beta (TGF-beta) by directly interacting with Smads and repressing the transcription of TGF-beta responsive genes. This has been associated with cancer due to the large number of roles that peptide growth factors, of which TGF-beta are a subfamily, play in regulating cellular functions such as cell proliferation, apoptosis, specification, and developmental fate.

The name SKI comes from the Sloan Kettering Institute where the protein was initially discovered.

== Structure ==
=== Gene ===
The SKI proto-oncogene is located at a region close to the p73 tumor suppressor gene at the locus 1p36.3 locus of a gene, suggesting a similar function to the p73 gene.

=== Protein ===
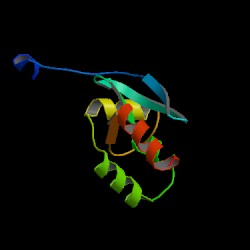
Crystal structure of the Dachshund-homology domain of human SKI

The SKI protein has a 728 amino acid sequence, with multiple domains. It is expressed both inside and outside of the nucleus. It is in the same family as the SnoN protein. The different domains have different functions, with the primary domains interacting with Smad proteins. The protein has a helix-turn-helix motif, a cysteine and histidine rich area which gives rise to the zinc finger motif, a basic amino acid region, and leucine zipper. All these domains, including a proline rich region, are consistent with the fact that the protein must have domains that allow it to interact with other proteins. The protein also has hydrophobic regions which come into contact with Smad proteins rich in leucine and phenylalanine amino acid regions. Recent studies have suggested a domain similar to the Dachshund protein. The SKI-Dachshund homology domain (SKI-DHD) contains the helix turn helix domains of the protein and the beta-alpha-beta turn motifs.

== Function ==
The SKI oncogene is present in all cells, and is commonly active during development. Specifically, avian fibroblasts depend on the SKI protein as a transcription co-regulator inducing transformation. The aforementioned DHD region is specifically employed for protein-protein interactions, while the 191 amino acid C terminus mediates oligomerization. Recent research shows that the SKI protein in cancerous cells acts as a suppressor, inhibiting transforming growth factor β (TGF- β) signaling. TGF- β is a protein which regulates cell growth. Signaling is regulated by a family of proteins called the Smad proteins. SKI is present in all adult and embryonic cells at low levels, however an over expression of the protein is characteristic of tumor cells. It is thought that high levels of SKI protein inactivate tumor suppression by displacement of other proteins and interference with the signaling pathway of TGF- β. The SKI protein and the CPB protein compete for binding with the Smad proteins, specifically competing with the Smad-3 and CReB-binding protein interactions. SKI also directly interacts with the R-Smad ∙ Smad-4 complex, which directly represses normal transcription of the TGF-β responsive genes, inactivating the cell's ability to stop growth and division, creating cancerous cells.

SKI has been linked to various cancers including human melanomas, esophageal squamous cell carcinoma, cervical cancer and the process of tumor progression. The link of SKI with human melanoma has been the most studied area of the protein's link to cancer. Currently it is thought that the SKI protein prevents response to TFG- β levels, causing tumor formation.

== Related research ==
Other research has identified proteins similar to Ski. The SnoN protein was identified as a similar protein and is often discussed in conjugation with the Ski protein in publications. Recent research suggests that the role of SnoN could be somewhat different, and could potentially even play an antagonistic role.

Other recent studies have determined Fussel-15 and Fussel-18 to be homologous to the Ski/Sno family of proteins. Fussel-15 has been found to play much the same role as the Ski/Sno proteins, however its expression is not as ubiquitous as the Ski/Sno proteins. Fussel-18 has been found to have an inhibitory role in the TGF-beta signaling.

Dachshund and SKIDA1 are also in the Ski/Sno/Dac family (InterPro: IPR003380, IPR023216.

== Interactions ==
SKI protein has been shown to interact with:

- HIPK2,
- MECP2,
- Mothers against decapentaplegic homolog 1 and
- Mothers against decapentaplegic homolog 2,
- Mothers against decapentaplegic homolog 3,
- NFIX,
- Promyelocytic leukemia protein,
- SKIL, and
- SNW1.
