= SKIL =

Protein-coding gene in humans

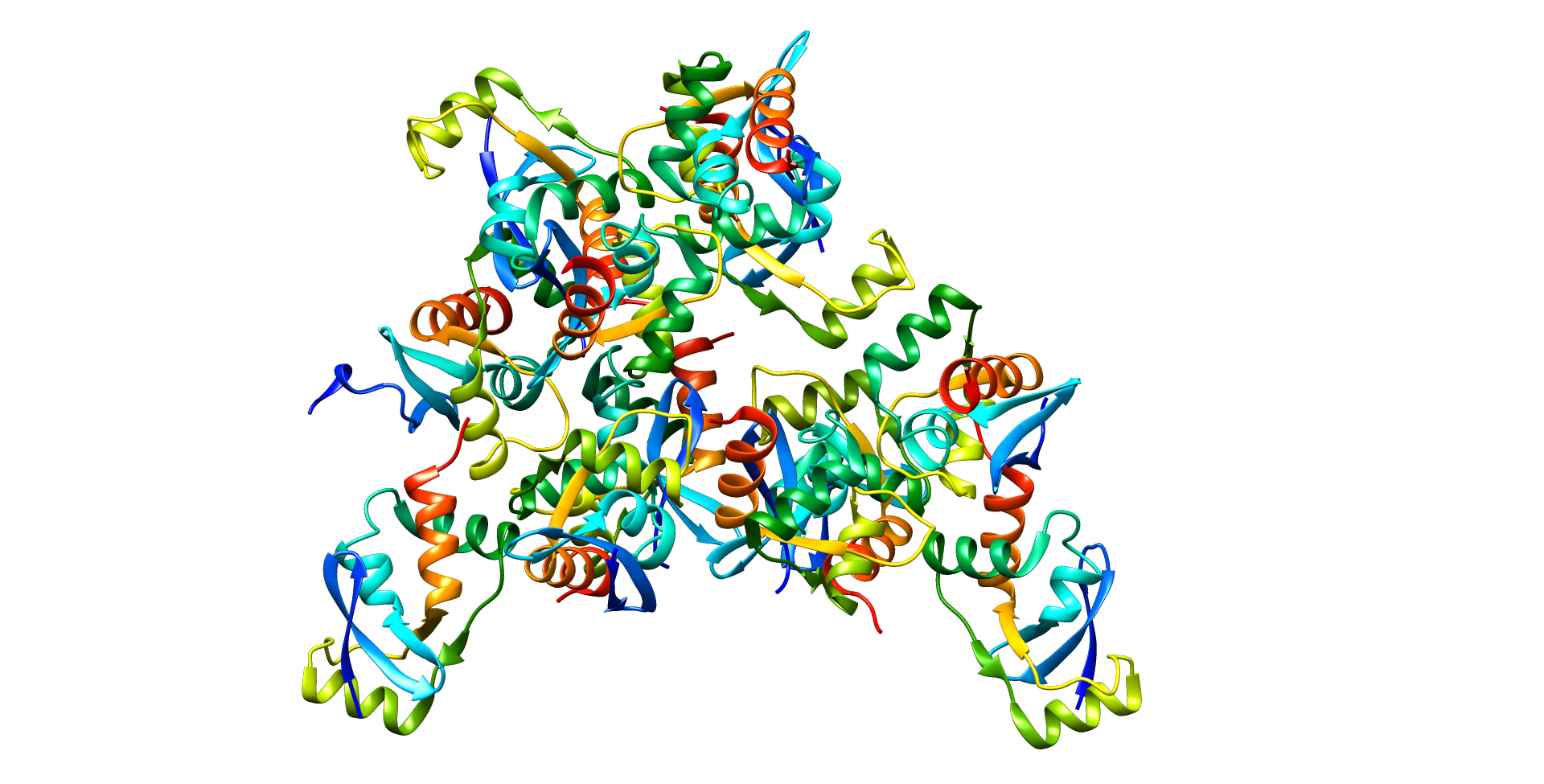

Identifiers
- Aliases: SKIL, SNO, SnoA, SnoI, SnoN, SKI-like proto-oncogene, SKI like proto-oncogene
- External IDs: OMIM: 165340; MGI: 106203; GeneCards: SKIL
Available structures
PDB	Ortholog search: PDBe RCSB
PDB	List of PDB id codes 3EQ5

Gene location (Human)
Chr.	Chromosome 3 (human)
Band	3q26.2	Start	170,357,678 bp
Band	3q26.2	End	170,396,835 bp

Gene location (Mouse)
Chr.	Chromosome 3 (mouse)
Band	3 A3|3 15.12 cM	Start	31,149,207 bp
Band	3 A3|3 15.12 cM	End	31,176,726 bp
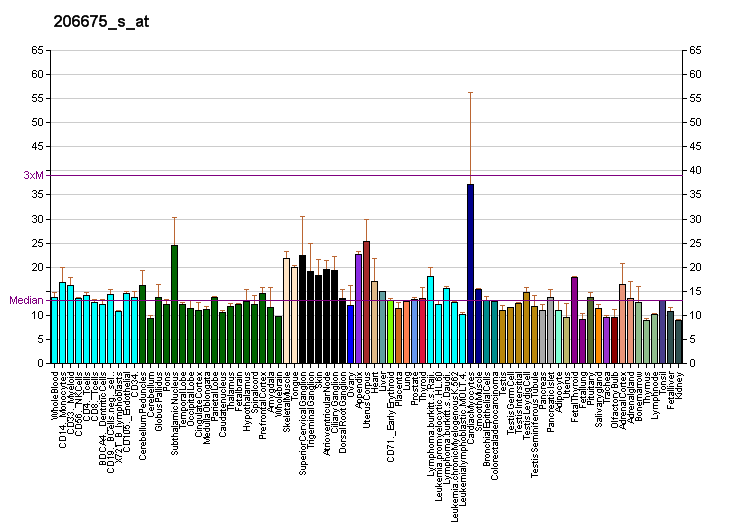
RNA expression pattern
Bgee	Human / Mouse (ortholog); Top expressed in: tendon of biceps brachii; mucosa of paranasal sinus; jejunal mucosa; Achilles tendon; Skeletal muscle tissue of biceps brachii; visceral pleura; epithelium of nasopharynx; epithelium of colon; endothelial cell; superficial temporal artery / Top expressed in: molar; cumulus cell; external carotid artery; pineal gland; tunica media of zone of aorta; ciliary body; body of femur; mesenteric lymph nodes; internal carotid artery; umbilical cord; More reference expression data
BioGPS	More reference expression data
Gene ontology
Molecular function	DNA binding; transcription corepressor activity; protein domain specific binding; RNA polymerase II cis-regulatory region sequence-specific DNA binding; DNA-binding transcription repressor activity, RNA polymerase II-specific; protein binding; SMAD binding; chromatin binding; DNA-binding transcription factor activity, RNA polymerase II-specific; protein-containing complex binding
Cellular component	cytoplasm; PML body; nucleoplasm; acrosomal vesicle; nucleus; protein-containing complex
Biological process	positive regulation of extrinsic apoptotic signaling pathway via death domain receptors; response to cytokine; lymphocyte homeostasis; response to antibiotic; negative regulation of transcription by RNA polymerase II; blastocyst formation; positive regulation of axonogenesis; protein homotrimerization; lens fiber cell differentiation; positive regulation of intrinsic apoptotic signaling pathway in response to DNA damage; spermatogenesis; protein heterotrimerization; response to growth factor; skeletal muscle tissue development; negative regulation of BMP signaling pathway; transforming growth factor beta receptor signaling pathway; negative regulation of transforming growth factor beta receptor signaling pathway; neuron development; negative regulation of cell differentiation
Sources:Amigo / QuickGO
Orthologs
Databases	NCBI: entry; OMA: entry
Species	Human	Mouse
Entrez	6498	20482
Ensembl	ENSG00000136603	ENSMUSG00000027660
UniProt	P12757	Q60665
RefSeq (mRNA)	NM_001145097; NM_001145098; NM_001248008; NM_005414	NM_001039090; NM_001271772; NM_011386; NM_001398558; NM_001398559 NM_001398560
RefSeq (protein)	NP_001138569; NP_001138570; NP_001234937; NP_005405	NP_001034179; NP_001258701; NP_035516; NP_001385487; NP_001385488 NP_001385489
Location (UCSC)	Chr 3: 170.36 – 170.4 Mb	Chr 3: 31.15 – 31.18 Mb
PubMed search
- Wikidata
View/Edit Human	View/Edit Mouse

Ski-like protein is a protein that in humans is encoded by the SKIL gene.

== Interactions ==
SKIL interacts with SKI protein, Mothers against decapentaplegic homolog 3 and Mothers against decapentaplegic homolog 2.

== Protein family ==
SKIL belongs to the Ski/Sno/Dac family, shared by SKI protein, Dachshund, and SKIDA1. Members of the Ski/Sno/Dac family share a domain that is roughly 100 amino acids long.
