= Simple eye in invertebrates =

Simple eye without retina

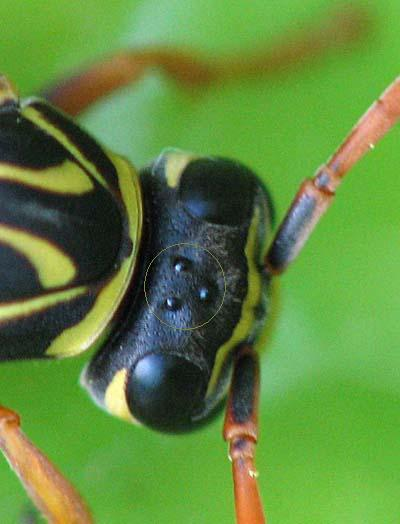
Head of Polistes with two compound eyes and three ocelli (circled)

A simple eye or ocellus (sometimes called a pigment pit) is a form of eye or an optical arrangement which has a single lens without the sort of elaborate retina that occurs in most vertebrates. These eyes are called "simple" to distinguish them from "compound eyes", which have multiple lenses; they are not necessarily simple in the sense of being uncomplicated or basic.

The structure of an animal's eye is determined by the environment in which it lives, and the behavioural tasks it must fulfill to survive. Arthropods differ widely in the habitats in which they live, as well as their visual requirements for finding food or conspecifics, and avoiding predators. Consequently, an enormous variety of eye types are found in arthropods to overcome visual problems or limitations.

Use of the term simple eye is flexible, and must be interpreted in proper context; for example, the eyes of most large animals are camera eyes and are sometimes considered "simple" because a single lens collects and focuses an entire image onto the retina (analogous to a camera). By other criteria, the presence of a complex retina distinguishes the vertebrate camera eye from the simple stemma or ommatidia which make up compound eyes. Additionally, not all invertebrate ocelli and ommatidia have simple photoreceptors. Many have various forms of retinula (a retina-like cluster of photoreceptor cells), including the ommatidia of most insects and the central eyes of camel spiders. Jumping spiders and some other predatory spiders with seemingly simple eyes also emulate retinal vision in various ways. Many insects have unambiguously compound eyes consisting of multiple lenses (up to tens of thousands), but achieve an effect similar to that of an eye, in that each ommatidium lens focuses light onto a number of neighbouring retinulae.

== Ocelli or eye spots ==
Some jellyfish, sea stars, flatworms, and ribbonworms have the simplest "eyes" – pigment spot ocelli – which have randomly distributed pigment, and which have no other structure (such as a cornea, or lens). The apparent "eye color" in these animals is red or black. Certain groups such as box jellyfish have more complex eyes, including some with a distinct retina, lens, and cornea.

Many snails and slugs also have ocelli, either at the tips or bases of their tentacles. Some other gastropods, such as the Strombidae, have much more sophisticated eyes. Giant clams have ocelli that allow light to penetrate their mantles.

== Simple eyes in arthropods ==
=== Spider eyes ===
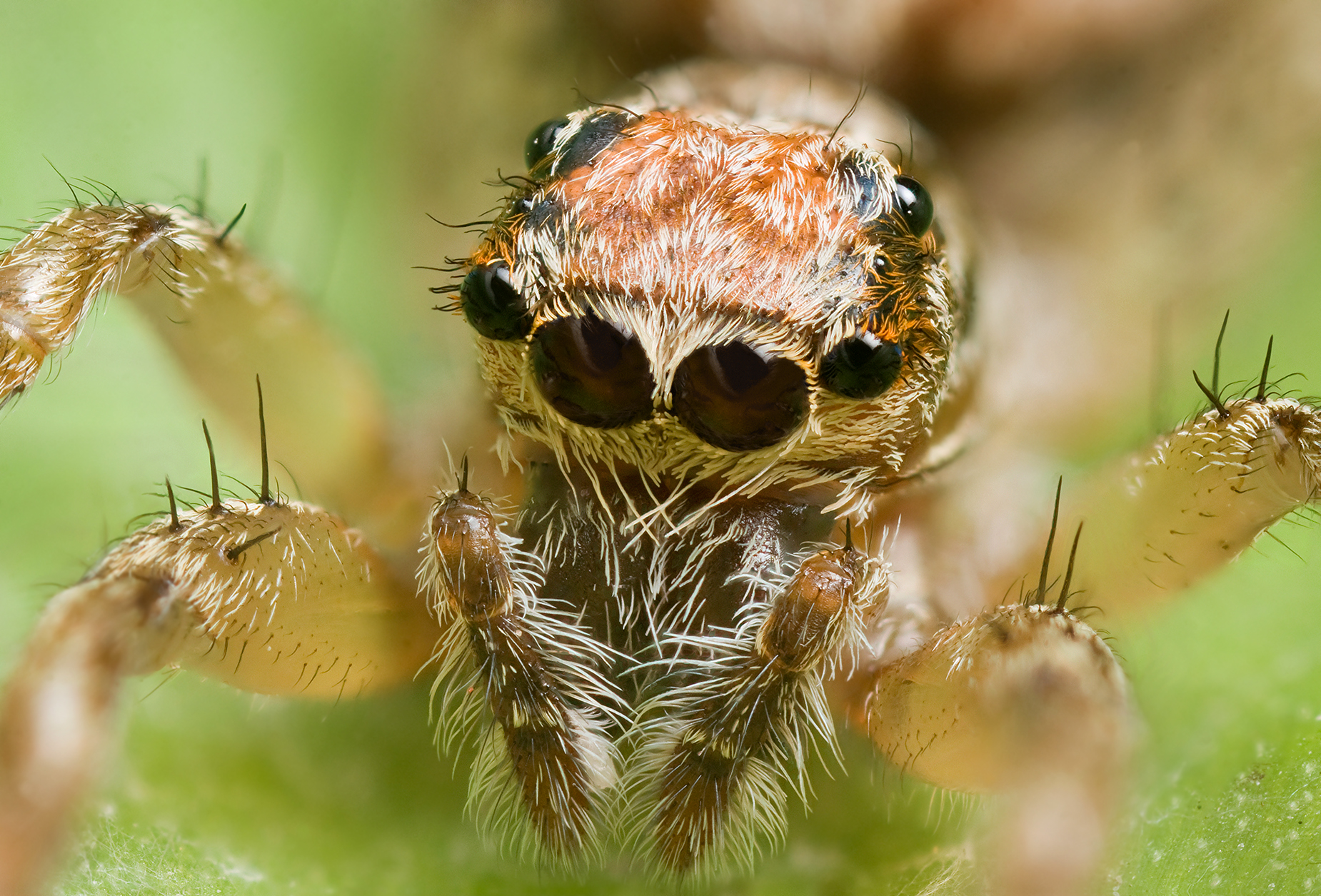
This jumping spider's main ocelli (center pair) are very acute. The outer pair are "secondary eyes" and other pairs of secondary eyes are on the sides and top of its head.

Spiders do not have compound eyes, but instead have several pairs of simple eyes with each pair adapted for a specific task or tasks. The principal and secondary eyes in spiders are arranged in four, or occasionally fewer, pairs. Only the principal eyes have moveable retinas. The secondary eyes have a reflector at the back of the eyes. The light-sensitive part of the receptor cells is next to this, so they get direct and reflected light. In hunting or jumping spiders, for example, a forward-facing pair possesses the best resolution (and even some telescopic ability) to help spot prey from a distance. Nocturnal spiders' eyes are very sensitive in low light levels and are large to capture more light, equivalent to f/0.58 in the rufous net-casting spider.

=== Dorsal ocelli ===
Head of a wasp with three dorsal ocelli (centre), and the upper part of its compound eyes (left and right)

The term "ocellus" (plural ocelli) is derived from the Latin oculus (eye), and literally means "little eye". In insects, two distinct ocellus types exist: dorsal (top-most) ocelli, and lateral ocelli (often referred to as ocelli and stemmata, respectively), most insects have dorsal ocelli while stemmata are found in the larvae of some insect orders. Despite the shared name, they are structurally and functionally very different. Simple eyes of other animals may also be referred to as ocelli, but again the structure and anatomy of these eyes is quite distinct from those of insect dorsal ocelli.

Dorsal ocelli are light-sensitive organs found on the dorsal surface or frontal surface of the head of many insects, including Hymenoptera (bees, ants, wasps, sawflies), Diptera (flies), Odonata (dragonflies, damselflies), Orthoptera (grasshoppers, locusts), Mantodea (mantises), and various groups within Heteroptera (true bugs). These ocelli coexist with compound eyes; thus, most insects possess two anatomically separate and functionally different visual pathways.

The number, forms, and functions of the dorsal ocelli vary markedly throughout insect orders. They tend to be larger and more strongly expressed in flying insects (particularly bees, wasps, dragonflies and locusts) where they are typically found as a triplet. Two ocelli are directed to either side of the head, while a central (median) ocellus is directed forwards. In some terrestrial insects (e.g. some ants and cockroaches), the median ocellus is absent. The sideways-facing ocelli can be called "lateral ocelli", referring to their direction and position in the triplet, however this is not to be confused with the stemmata of some insect larvae, which are also known as lateral ocelli.

In many members of the suborder Heteroptera (true bugs), such as stink bugs Pentatomidae, assassin bugs Reduviidae, and seed bugs Lygaeidae, only two dorsal ocelli are present. These are typically positioned symmetrically on the vertex, between or slightly behind the compound eyes. This two-ocelli arrangement is a distinguishing trait in several Heteropteran families and differs from the more common three-ocelli configuration found in other insect orders.

A dorsal ocellus consists of a lens element (cornea) and a layer of photoreceptors (rod cells). The ocellar lens may be strongly curved or flat. The photoreceptor layer may also be separated from the lens by a clear vitreous humour. The number of photoreceptors also varies widely, but may number in the hundreds or thousands for well-developed ocelli. In bees, locusts, and dragonflies, the lens is strongly curved; while in cockroaches it is flat. Locusts possess vitreous humour while blowflies and dragonflies do not.

Two somewhat unusual features of ocelli are particularly notable and generally common between insect orders.

1. The refractive power of the lens is not typically sufficient to form an image on the photoreceptor layer, essentially it is out of focus.
2. Dorsal ocelli ubiquitously have massive convergence ratios from first-order (photoreceptor) to second-order neurons.

These two factors have led to the conclusion that, with some exceptions in predatory insects, the ocelli are incapable of perceiving proper images and are thus solely suitable for light-metering functions. Given the large aperture and low f-number of the lens, as well as high convergence ratios and synaptic gains (amplification of photoreceptor signals), the ocelli are generally considered to be far more sensitive to light than the compound eyes. Additionally, given the relatively simple neural arrangement of the eye (small number of synapses between detector and effector), as well as the extremely large diameter of some ocellar interneurons (often the largest diameter neurons in the animal's nervous system), the ocelli are typically considered to be "faster" than the compound eyes.

One common theory of ocellar function in flying insects holds that they are used to assist in maintaining flight stability. Given their underfocused nature, wide fields of view, and high light-collecting ability, the ocelli are superbly adapted for measuring changes in the perceived brightness of the external world as an insect rolls or pitches around its body axis during flight. Locusts and dragonflies in tethered flight have been observed to try and "correct" their flight posture based on changes in light. Other theories of ocellar function have ranged from roles as light adaptors or global excitatory organs to polarization sensors and circadian entrainers.

Recent studies have shown the ocelli of some insects (most notably the dragonfly, but also some wasps) are capable of "form vision" similar to camera eyes, as the ocellar lens forms an image within, or close to, the photoreceptor layer. In dragonflies it has been demonstrated that the receptive fields of both the photoreceptors and the second-order neurons can be quite restricted. Further research has demonstrated these eyes not only resolve spatial details of the world, but also perceive motion. Second-order neurons in the dragonfly median ocellus respond more strongly to upwards-moving bars and gratings than to downwards-moving bars and gratings, but this effect is only present when ultraviolet light is used in the stimulus; when ultraviolet light is absent, no directional response is observed. Dragonfly ocelli are especially highly developed and specialised visual organs, which may support the exceptional acrobatic abilities of these animals.

Research on the ocelli is of high interest to designers of small unmanned aerial vehicles. Designers of these craft face many of the same challenges that insects face in maintaining stability in a three-dimensional world. Engineers are increasingly taking inspiration from insects to overcome these challenges.

=== Stemmata ===
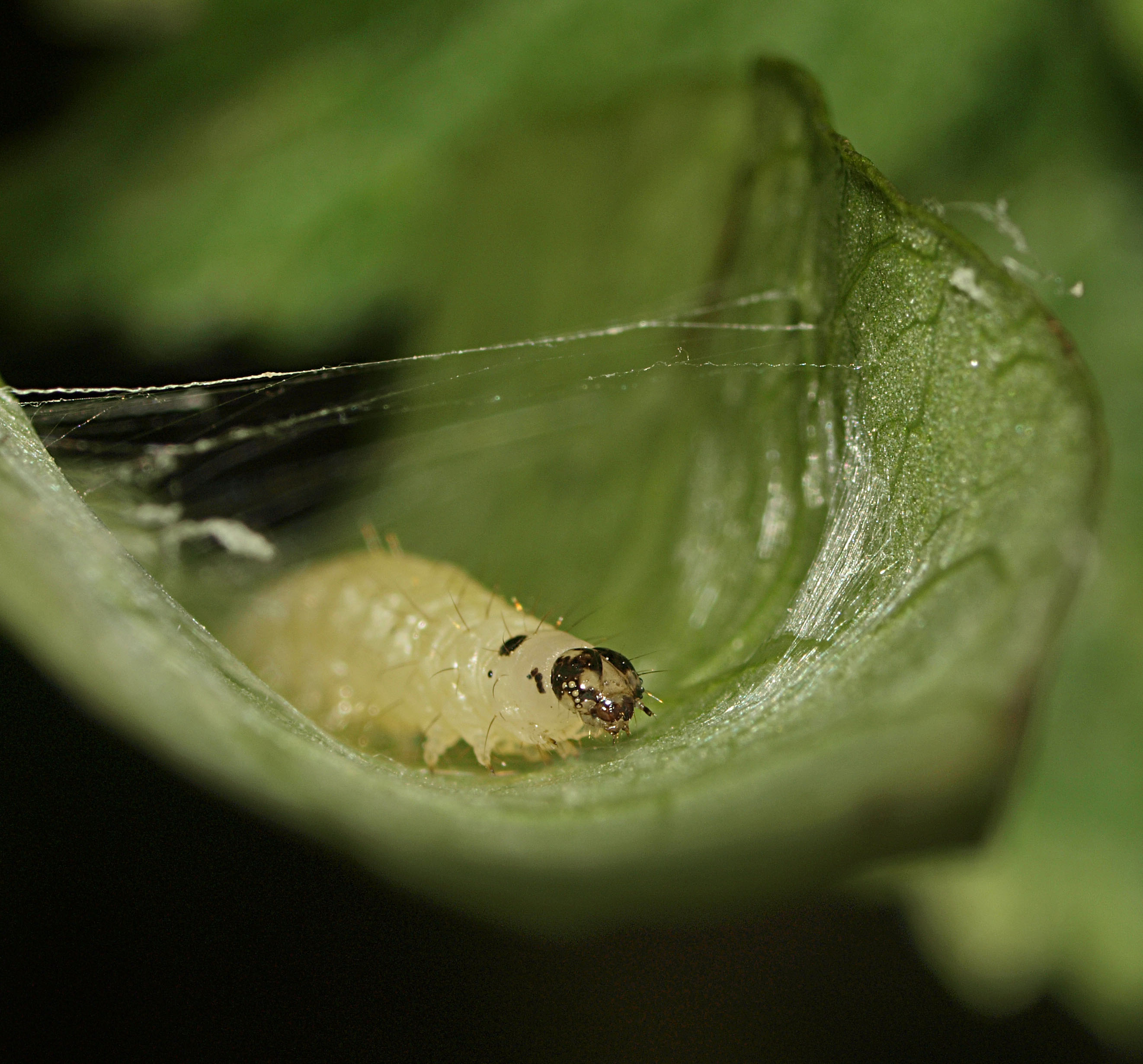
Moth larva about to moult; the new stemmata are visible behind the old head capsule

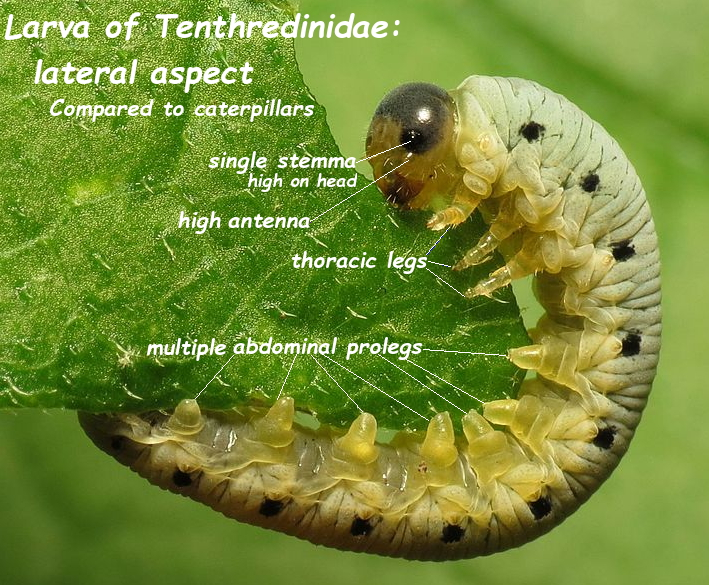
An example of a sawfly larva. It has just a single pair of stemmata, and they are set higher on its head than the position of stemmata on the heads of lepidopteran larvae.

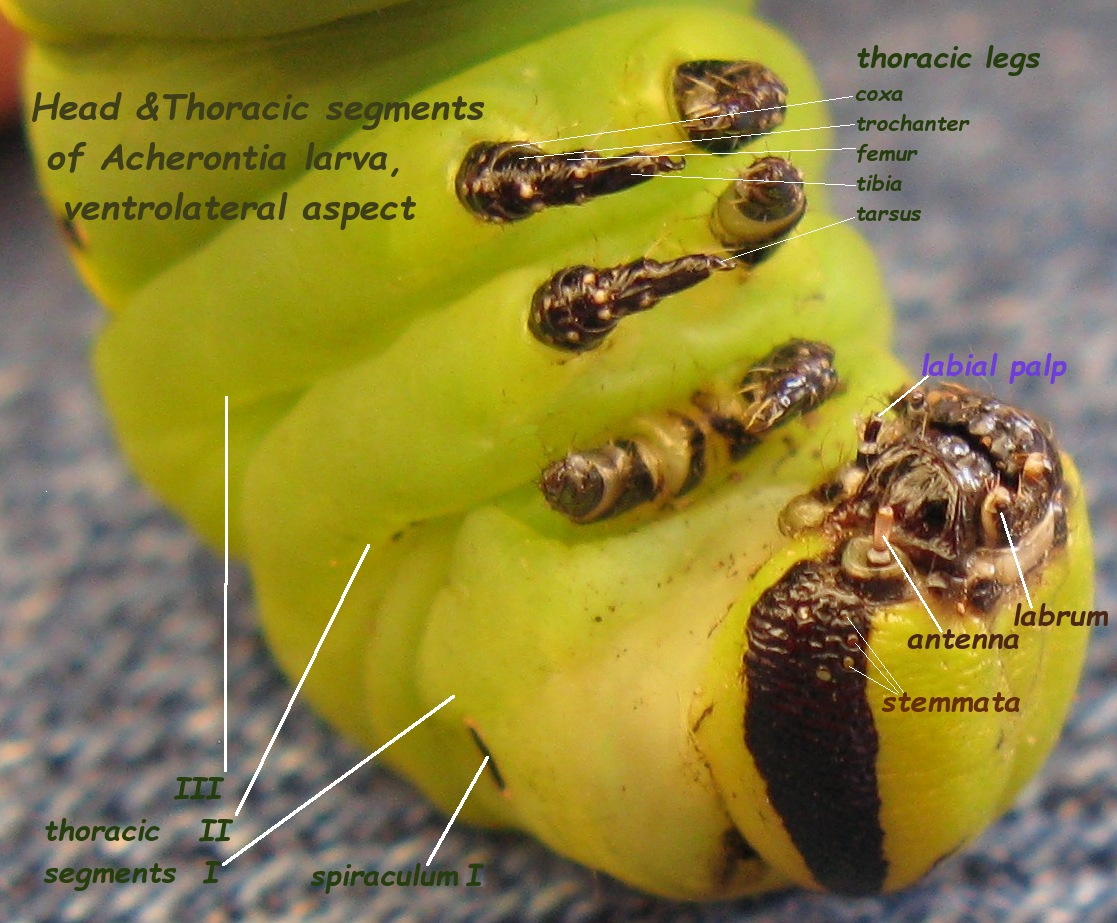
The larva of one of the Acherontia species shown here, is typical of the order Lepidoptera. The head of the larva bears more than one pair of stemmata, all of which are set low down and are far more widely placed than the mouthparts.

Stemmata (singular stemma) are a class of simple eyes. Many kinds of holometabolous larvae bear no other form of eyes until they enter their final stage of growth. Adults of several orders of hexapods also have stemmata, and never develop compound eyes at all. Examples include fleas, springtails, and Thysanura. Some other Arthropoda, such as some Myriapoda, rarely have any eyes other than stemmata at any stage of their lives (exceptions include the large and well-developed compound eyes of the house centipedes, Scutigera).

Behind each lens of a typical functional stemma lies a single cluster of photoreceptor cells, termed a retinula. The lens is biconvex, and the body of the stemma has a vitreous or crystalline core.

Although stemmata are simple eyes, some kinds (such as those of the larvae of Lepidoptera and especially those of Tenthredinidae, a family of sawflies) are only "simple" in that they represent immature or embryonic forms of the compound eyes of the adult. They can possess a considerable degree of acuity and sensitivity, and can detect polarized light. They may be optimized for light sensitivity, as opposed to detailed image formation. In the pupal stage, such stemmata develop into fully fledged compound eyes. One feature offering a clue to their ontogenetic role is their lateral position on the head; ocelli, that in other ways resemble stemmata, tend to be borne in sites median to the compound eyes, or nearly so. Among some researchers, this distinction has led to the use of the term "lateral ocelli" for stemmata.

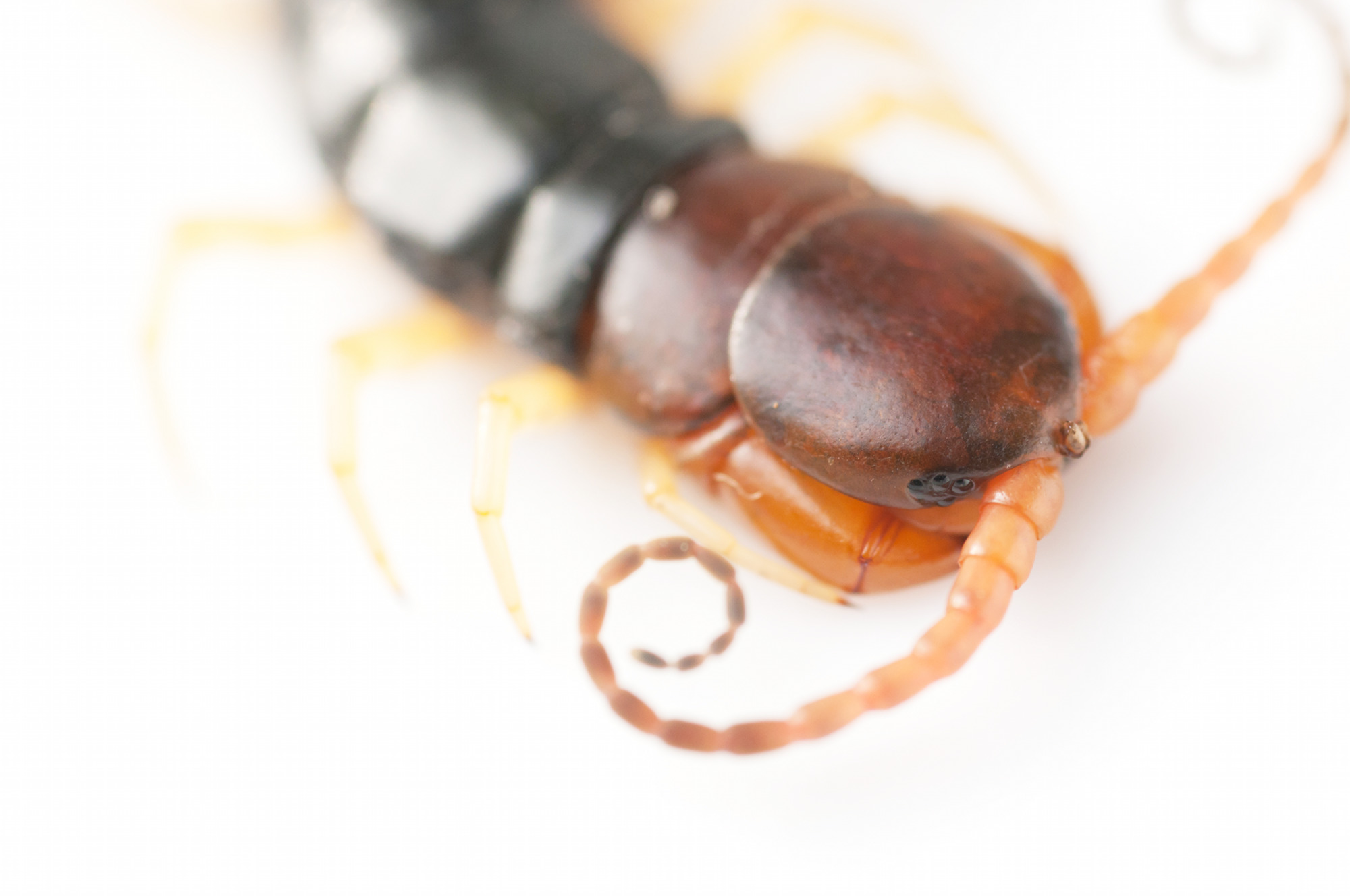
A Scolopendra species (Chilopoda) with stemmata incompletely aggregated into compound eyes

== Genetic controls ==
A number of genetic pathways are responsible for the occurrence and positioning of the ocelli. The orthodenticle gene is allelic to ocelliless, a mutation that stops ocelli from being produced. In Drosophila, the rhodopsin Rh2 is only expressed in simple eyes.

While (in Drosophila at least) the eyeless and dachshund genes are both expressed in the compound eye but not the simple eye, no reported "developmental" genes are uniquely expressed in the simple eye.

Epidermal growth factor receptor (Egfr) promotes the expression of orthodenticle and possibly eyes absent (Eya) and as such is essential for simple eye formation.

== See also ==
- Arthropod eye
- Evolution of the eye
- Eyespot apparatus
- Mollusc eye
- Ocelloid
- Parietal eye
