= Holochroal eye =

Compound eye type found on triobites

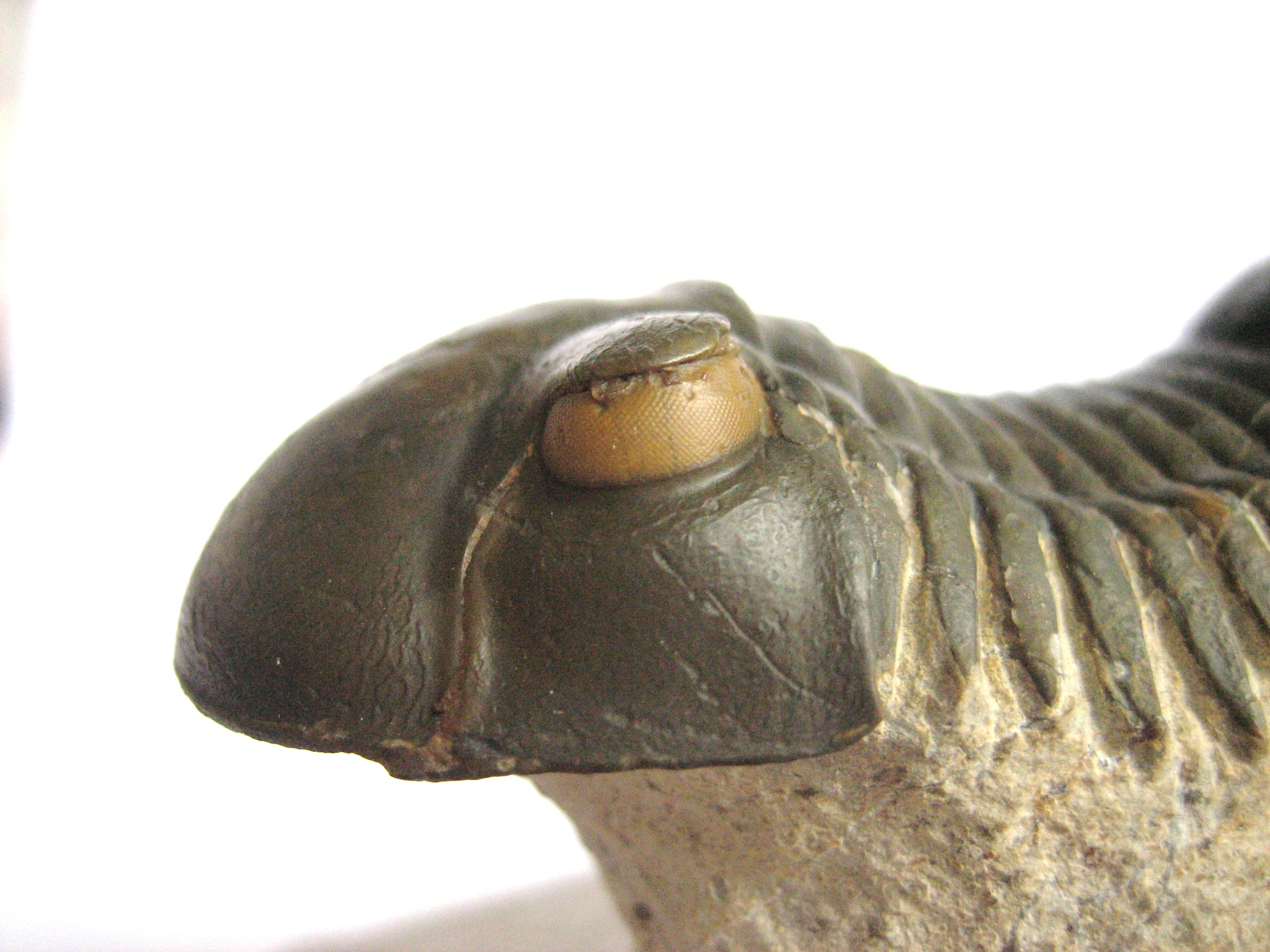
The holochroal eye of Paralejurus sp.

Holochroal eyes are compound eyes with many tiny lenses (sometimes more than 15,000, each 30-100μm, rarely larger). They are the oldest and most common type of trilobite eye, and found in all orders of trilobite from the Cambrian to the Permian periods. Lenses (composed of calcite) covered a curved, kidney-shaped visual surface in a hexagonal close packing system, with a single corneal membrane covering all lenses. Unlike in schizochroal eyes, adjacent lenses were in direct contact with one another. Lens shape generally depended on cuticle thickness. The lenses of trilobites with thin cuticles were thin and biconvex, whereas those with thick cuticles had thick lenses, which in extreme cases, could be thick columns with the outer surface flattened and the inner surface hemispherical. Regardless of lens thickness, however, the point at which light was focused was roughly the same distance below the lens.
