= DACH1 =

Protein-coding gene in the species Homo sapiens

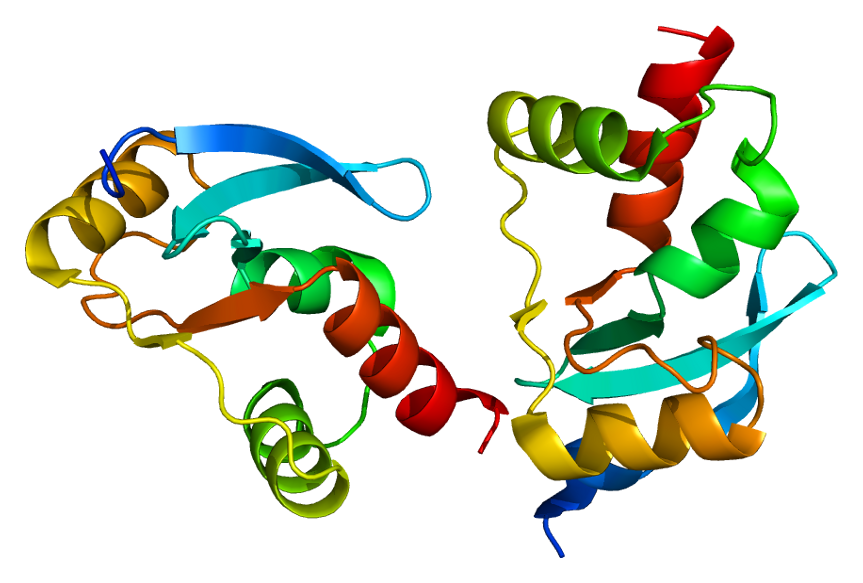

Identifiers
- Aliases: DACH1, DACH, dachshund family transcription factor 1
- External IDs: OMIM: 603803; MGI: 1277991; GeneCards: DACH1
Available structures
PDB	Ortholog search: PDBe RCSB
PDB	List of PDB id codes 1L8R

Gene location (Human)
Chr.	Chromosome 13 (human)
Band	13q21.33	Start	71,437,966 bp
Band	13q21.33	End	71,867,204 bp

Gene location (Mouse)
Chr.	Chromosome 14 (mouse)
Band	14 E2.1|14 48.25 cM	Start	98,024,289 bp
Band	14 E2.1|14 48.25 cM	End	98,407,201 bp
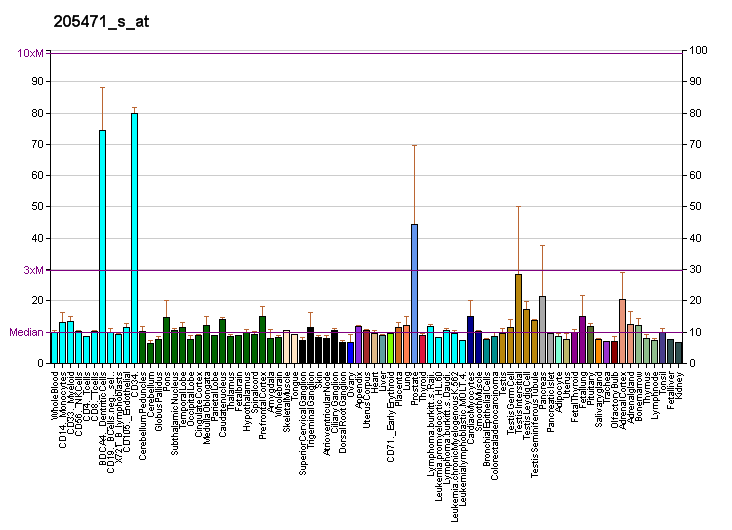

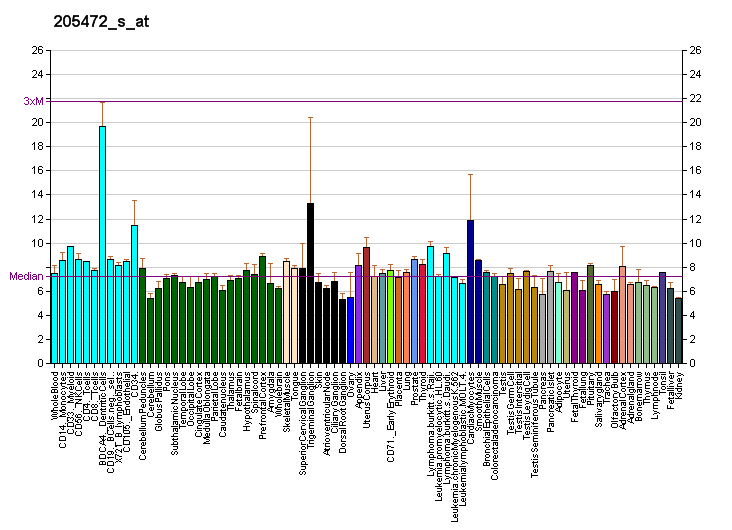
RNA expression pattern
Bgee	Human / Mouse (ortholog); Top expressed in: ventricular zone; endothelial cell; ganglionic eminence; buccal mucosa cell; glomerulus; hair follicle; metanephros; gonad; visceral pleura; metanephric glomerulus / Top expressed in: renal corpuscle; left lung lobe; medullary collecting duct; vas deferens; ventricular zone; granulocyte; dorsal striatum; lobe of prostate; vestibular membrane of cochlear duct; hair follicle; More reference expression data
BioGPS	More reference expression data
Gene ontology
Molecular function	DNA binding; DNA-binding transcription factor activity; DNA-binding transcription repressor activity, RNA polymerase II-specific; protein binding; RNA polymerase II transcription regulatory region sequence-specific DNA binding; RNA polymerase II cis-regulatory region sequence-specific DNA binding; RNA polymerase II general transcription initiation factor activity; DNA-binding transcription factor activity, RNA polymerase II-specific
Cellular component	cytoplasm; nucleus; transcription regulator complex
Biological process	regulation of transcription, DNA-templated; negative regulation of transcription by competitive promoter binding; RNA polymerase II preinitiation complex assembly; negative regulation of transcription by RNA polymerase II; respiratory gaseous exchange by respiratory system; transcription, DNA-templated; development of primary female sexual characteristics; negative regulation of cell migration; regulation of nuclear cell cycle DNA replication; negative regulation of cell proliferation involved in contact inhibition; cell population proliferation; negative regulation of transcription, DNA-templated; negative regulation of fibroblast proliferation; negative regulation of DNA biosynthetic process; suckling behavior; multicellular organism development; transcription by RNA polymerase II
Sources:Amigo / QuickGO
Orthologs
Databases	NCBI: entry; OMA: entry
Species	Human	Mouse
Entrez	1602	13134
Ensembl	ENSG00000276644	ENSMUSG00000055639
UniProt	Q9UI36	Q9QYB2
RefSeq (mRNA)	NM_004392; NM_080759; NM_080760; NM_001366712	NM_001038610; NM_007826
RefSeq (protein)	NP_004383; NP_542937; NP_542938; NP_001353641	NP_001033699; NP_031852
Location (UCSC)	Chr 13: 71.44 – 71.87 Mb	Chr 14: 98.02 – 98.41 Mb
PubMed search
- Wikidata
View/Edit Human	View/Edit Mouse

Dachshund homolog 1, also known as DACH1, is a protein which in humans is encoded by the DACH1 gene. DACH1 has been shown to interact with Ubc9, Smad4, and NCoR.

== Structure ==
=== Gene structure ===
This protein coding gene has 760 amino acid protein, and an observed molecular weight of 52 kDa. Dachshund Family transcription factor 1 is encoded by DACH gene, who spans 400kDa and is encoded by 12 exons. This gene is located, in humans, in chromosome 13 (13q22). It encodes a chromatin-associated protein that associates with other DNA-binding transcription factors to regulate gene expression, mRNA translation, coactivator binding, and cell fate determination during development.

Multiple transcript variants encoding different isoforms have been found for this gene. Four alternatively spliced transcripts encoding different isoforms have been described for this gene.DACH1 mRNA was detected in multiple human tissues, including kidney and heart. Dach1 is located in nuclear and cytoplasmic pools and is considered a cell fate determination factor. Dachshund domain 1 (DD1, also known as Box-N) has a predicted helix–turn–helix family structure. The X-ray crystal structure of the human DACH1 Box-N illustrates that the DACH1 protein contains a domain that is conserved with the pro-oncogenes ski/sno oncogenes, which form an α/β structure similar to that found in the winged helix/forkhead subgroup of DNA binding proteins. This protein is widely expressed including bone marrow, brain, colon, eye, heart, kidney, leucocyte, liver, lung, pancreas, pineal gland, placenta, prostate, retina, skeletal muscle, small intestine, stromal/preosteoblasts and the spleen.

=== Protein modification ===
DACH1 is modified by phosphorylation, acetylation, and SUMOYlation. Acetylation of Dach1 determine binding to the p53 tumor suppressor, and thereby governs a subset of p53 functions involved in stem cell restraint and the inhibition of cellular proliferation. SUMOYlation of DACH governs HDAC binding. Phosphorylation of Dach1 contributes to YB-1 binding, subcellular distribution and the induction of EMT via translation of EMT regulatory genes.

DACH1 Secondary Structure.

== Function ==
=== Organismal development ===
Dach1 is similar to the D. melanogaster dac gene, which encodes a nuclear factor essential for determining cell fates in the eye, leg, and nervous system of the fly. Dach is a member of the Ski gene family and is involved in eye and organismal development. Dach1 deletion mice exhibit early postnatal death, although no developmental defects were detected in any organ system examined, including kidneys. DACH1 plays an important role on this precursor of cell proliferation in retinal and pituitary.

=== Restrain of cancer cell growth ===
DACH1 protein is able to prevent the proliferation of cancerous cells (lung, breast, prostate) and functions as a repressor of estrogen receptor activity in breast cancer cells.

=== Transcription ===
DACH1 conducts transcriptional function through interacting with transcription factors including c-Jun, estrogen receptor alpha, the androgen receptor, and the basal transcription apparatus through binding to the co-integrator protein CA150. Curiously, DACH1 selectively bound to the delta domain of c-Jun, which was known to interact with an endogenous cellular repressor. DACH1 binds directly with a Forkhead-like DNA sequence to restrain oncogenic signals from a subset of FKHR proteins. Dach1 governs mRNA translation of an EMT signature and governs Snail1 transcription.

=== Cell migration ===
DACH1 inhibits migration of vascular endothelial cells, fibroblasts and prostate epithelial cells wherein DACH1 maintains persistence of migratory directionality via heterotypic signals.

== Disease relevance ==
=== Cancer ===
DACH1 has been implicated in suppression of tumor growth, and has been proposed as a putative tumor suppressor although no formal in vivo evidence has been published to date. Supporting evidence includes the finding that Dach1 expression is reduced in human malignancies including breast, lung, prostate and brain tumors. DACH1 inhibits Cyclin D1 expression and thereby reduces breast cancer cell line cell growth. Normal cells and some breast cancer cells have receptors that bind estrogen and progesterone. These two hormones often promote the growth of breast cancer cells. Approximately 70% of breast cancers are ERa+, DACH1 expression decreases when the cancer is more invasive and the level of estrogen is high.

=== Nephropathy ===
Renal hypodysplasia (RHD) is characterized by small and/or disorganized kidneys following abnormal organogenesis. Double homozygous missense mutations of DACH1 and BMP4 occurred in a patient with bilateral cystic dysplasia. Functional analysis of the DACH1 mutation (p.R684C). demonstrated enhanced suppression of the TGF-β pathway. Dach1 is highly expressed in the adult podocyte, with transcripts showing an approximate tenfold enrichment compared to total kidney cortex. It is also more widely expressed in the earlier developing kidney, but again including definite podocyte expression.

=== Diabetes ===
Hepatocyte the abundance of DACH1 Is Increased in the hepatocytes of Obese patients. Dach1 promotes hepatic insulin resistance via Nuclear Exclusion of HDAC4.
