= Orthodenticle =

Orthodenticle (otd) is a homeobox gene found in Drosophila that regulates the development of anterior patterning, with particular involvement in the central nervous system function and eye development. It is located on the X chromosome. The gene is an ortholog of the human OTX1/OTX2 gene.

== Function ==
During embryonic Drosophila development, otd is required for the head and ventral midline to develop correctly. In the larval stage, otd is expressed in specific sac-like epithelial structures known as imaginal discs that later give rise to external structures of the head and thorax. Particularly, otd is required for the development of the dorsal region of the adult Drosophila head, that forms from the fusion of two eye-antennal discs. Distribution of the otd protein occurs along a concentration of the imaginal disc primordia for these head structures such that different levels of otd expression are required for differential mediolateral subdomains to be established. In Drosophila, the function of otd as an essential factor in anterior pattern formation has been replaced by Bicoid, another homeodomain protein which is involved in anterior patterning such that bcd mRNA is sequestered at the anterior pole of the mature oocyte. In the absence of bcd, all anterior structures of the embryo including the cephalic and thoracic segments fail to develop, and duplications of posterior structures are observed instead.

Additionally, otd is involved in development of all eight photoreceptors of adult Drosophila in each of their ~700 individual eye units, known as ommatidia and their proximal-distal distribution in the eye. The two types of photoreceptors, outer (OPRs) and inner (IPRs), are distinguished through their function and anatomy such that OPRs have six neurons that respond to dim light conditions and are important for motion detection, while IPRs have two neurons that differentiate colour. OPRs possess light-gathering apical surfaces called rhabdomeres, and otd is required for rhabdomere morphogenesis. Rapid expression of otd in all OPRs and IPRs is found following neuronal cell specification in the late larval stage and persists through photoreceptor differentiation. In later development of pupation through to adulthood, otd activates light detecting rhodopsin proteins Rh3 and Rh5 in IPRs while repressing Rh6 in OPRs.

== Regulation ==
=== Embryo ===
In the anterior cap region of the syncytial blastoderm, which has non-segregated nuclei along the periphery of the blastoderm, bicoid in low concentrations is sufficient to activate otd expression through an enhancer located upstream of the otd gene. Later, in the cellular blastoderm, which has all nuclei along the periphery separated in individual cells with their own cell membrane, otd expression is limited to a dorsal and anterior band due to repression of bicoid by torso, hunchback, and dorsal. Torso and hunchback expression represses otd expression in the anterior most region of the blastoderm while dorsal expression represses expression in the ventral region. Groucho-independent repression of otd by runt, a pair-rule gene, has also been observed in the anterior and posterior regions of the syncytial and cellular blastoderm.

== Ocelliless ==
Ocelliless (oc) is a general mutation in the otd gene locus in Drosophila, which results in a loss of ocelli: the three photoreceptor organs located on the anterior region of Drosophila heads Two alleles oc^{1} and oc^{γa1}, are caused by lesions downstream of the last exon in otd which showed enhancer activity. Another characteristic of the oc phenotype is the abnormal or deleted bristles in the ocellus region, which relates back to the wild type otd gene’s role in mediating anterior patterning. The same oc phenotype is found in loss-of-function epidermal growth factor receptor (EGFR) alleles and RNAi knockdown pointed (pnt) mutants

The effect of oc on ocelli can be complemented by otd^{uvi}, another hypomorphic allele of the otd gene. otd^{uvi}/oc heterozygotes shows no ocellar phenotype or photoreceptor (R cell) phenotype, a phenotype that is related with otd^{uvi} allele.

The Ocelliless mutant phenotype is not limited to loss of ocelli only. It has a role in disrupting oogenesis, where the inner and outer layer of the chorion in oc mutant eggs separate from one another leaving space for debris that is not seen in wild type otd, and disrupting reproductive capabilities, where female flies homozygous for the oc mutation are sterile.
