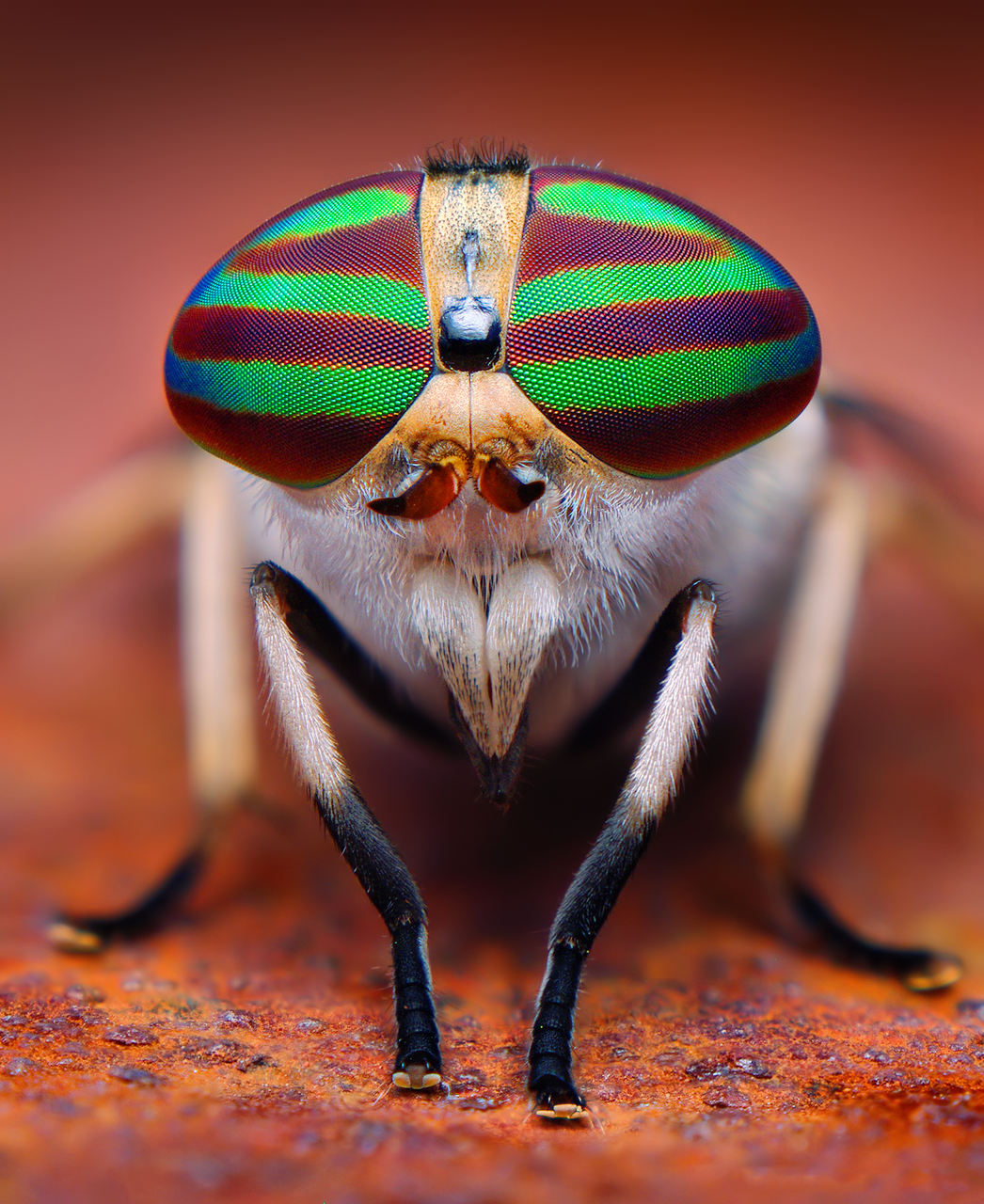
- Female

Scientific classification
- Kingdom: Animalia
- Phylum: Arthropoda
- Clade: Pancrustacea
- Class: Insecta
- Order: Diptera
- Family: Tabanidae
- Subfamily: Tabaninae
- Tribe: Tabanini
- Genus: Tabanus
- Species: T. lineola

Binomial name
- Tabanus lineola Fabricius, 1794

= Tabanus lineola =

Species of fly

Tabanus lineola, also known as the striped horse fly, is a species of biting horse-fly. It is known from the eastern coast of North America and the Gulf coast of Mexico.

== Description ==
Tabanus lineola females have a pale median stripe on their abdomen and are known for biting. The male does not bite and lacks hair on eyes.
