= MIR494 =

Identifiers
- Aliases: MIR494, MIRN494, hsa-mir-494, mir-494, microRNA 494
- External IDs: OMIM: 616036; GeneCards: MIR494; OMA:MIR494 - orthologs

Gene location (Human)
Chr.	Chromosome 14 (human)
Band	14q32.31	Start	101,029,634 bp
Band	14q32.31	End	101,029,714 bp
RNA expression pattern
Bgee	Human / Mouse (ortholog); Top expressed in: kidney; gonad; stomach; monocyte; placenta; heart; left ventricle; intestine; lung; colon / n/a; More reference expression data
BioGPS	n/a
Orthologs
Species	Human	Mouse
Entrez	574452	n/a
Ensembl	ENSG00000194717	n/a
UniProt	n a	n/a
RefSeq (mRNA)	n/a	n/a
RefSeq (protein)	n/a	n/a
Location (UCSC)	Chr 14: 101.03 – 101.03 Mb	n/a
PubMed search		n/a
- Wikidata
View/Edit Human

MicroRNA 494 is a microRNA sequence which is encoded in humans by the MIR494 gene.

== Function ==
MicroRNAs (miRNAs) are short (20–24 nucleotides) non-coding RNAs which are involved in post-transcriptional regulation of gene expression in multicellular organisms by affecting both the stability and translation of mRNAs. miRNAs are transcribed by RNA polymerase II as part of capped and polyadenylated primary transcripts (pri-miRNAs) that can be either protein-coding or non-coding. The primary transcript is cleaved by the Drosha ribonuclease III enzyme to produce an approximately 70-nucleotide stem-loop precursor miRNA (pre-miRNA), which is further cleaved by the cytoplasmic Dicer ribonuclease to generate the mature miRNA and antisense miRNA* ("mi-RNA star") products. The mature miRNA is incorporated into an RNA-induced silencing complex (RISC), which recognises target miRNAs through imperfect base pairing with the miRNA and most commonly results in translational inhibition or destabilisation of the target mRNA. This RefSeq represents the predicted microRNA stem-loop.
