= Dachshund (building) =

Building in Warsaw, Poland

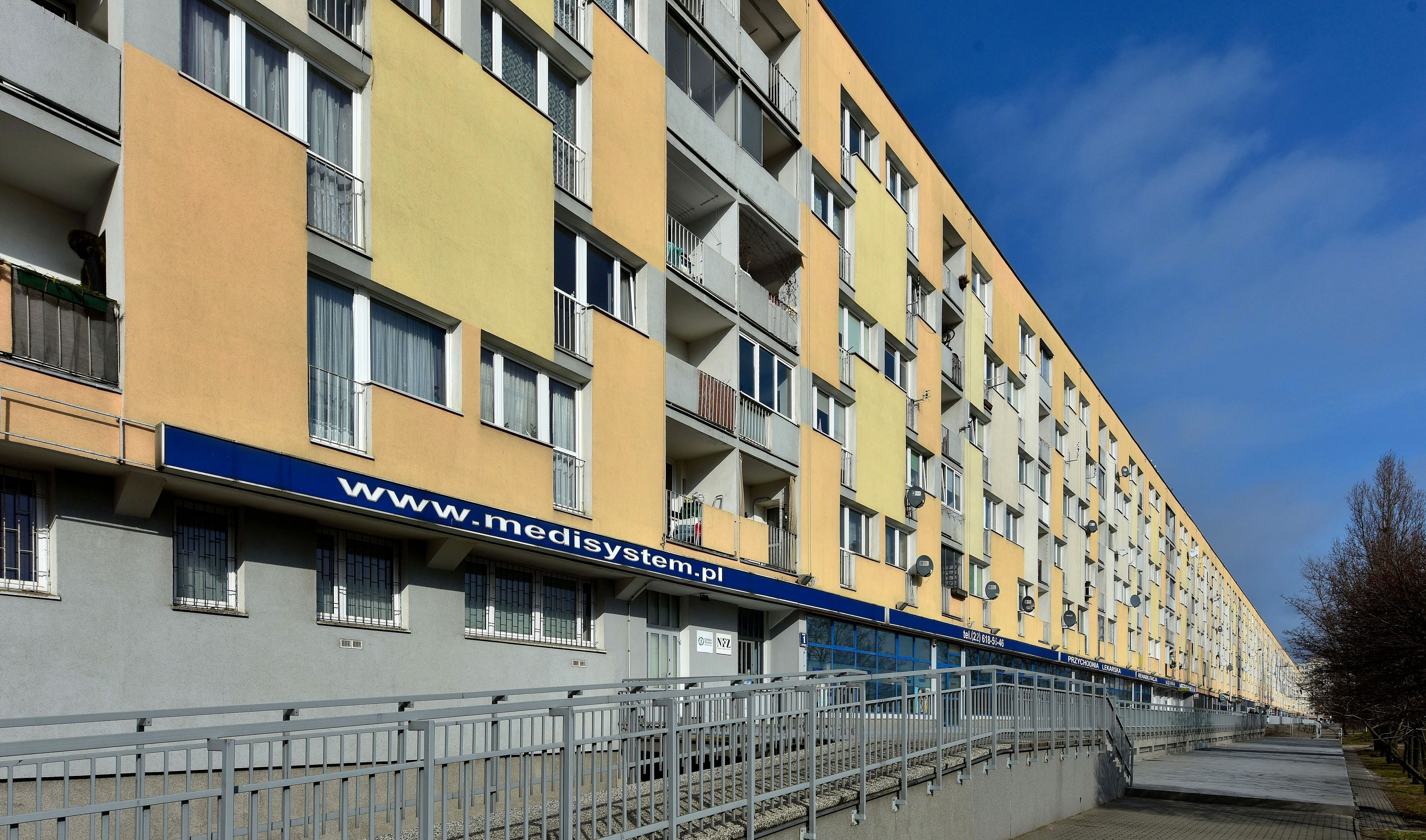
Dachshund, view from Markowska Street

Dachshund, plank, or mrówkowiec is a multi-family residential house located at Kijowska 11 street in the Praga-Północ district of Warsaw.

The building is 508 metres (1,667 ft) long and is known as the longest building in Warsaw.

== Description ==
It was built in 1971–1973 in the southern part of the Szmulowizna area, facing PKP Warszawa Wschodnia train station in Warsaw. The building, designed by Jan Kalinowski, was applauded by journalists when it was opened to its first residents. Despite its length, the building contains very small apartments and is plagued by noise from the busy street and train station nearby.

The building has 430 apartments and 132 garages, and as of 2008 was inhabited by over 1200 residents. The building contains 43 staircases, each of which serves about 10 apartments, with only two on each floor.

In order to break the monotony of this building, commercial center-pavilions in a comb shape were planned, but never built.

Due to the extreme length of the building, even at the construction stage, the problem of walls breaking appeared, and settling of the building appeared. On the old plaster the glass decorative elements can be observed. Their break was to be recognized as a signal for the building settling in the ground.

The building is considered to be the longest block of apartments in Warsaw. Another block of flats on Przyczółek Grochowski in Praga-Południe district (unofficially called Pekin) is about 1,500 metres (4,900 ft) long, but its shape does not make a line, and its parts have different street numbers.

== See also ==
- House types
- Falowiec
