= Dachshund (gene) =

Gene involved in developing the arthropod compound eye

Identifiers
- Organism: Drosophila melanogaster
- Symbol: dac
- UniProt: Q24030
Search for
- Structures: Swiss-model
- Domains: InterPro

dachshund (dac) is a gene involved in the development of the arthropod compound eye which also plays a role in leg development. It is activated by the Distal-less (Dll) gene.

Dachshund homologue (DACH1) regulates tumorigenesis in humans as a part of the Retinal Determination Gene Network (RDGN) complex, with cancer patients showing altered DACH1 expression. Its homologs form the SKI/SNO/DAC family (Pfam PF02437).
