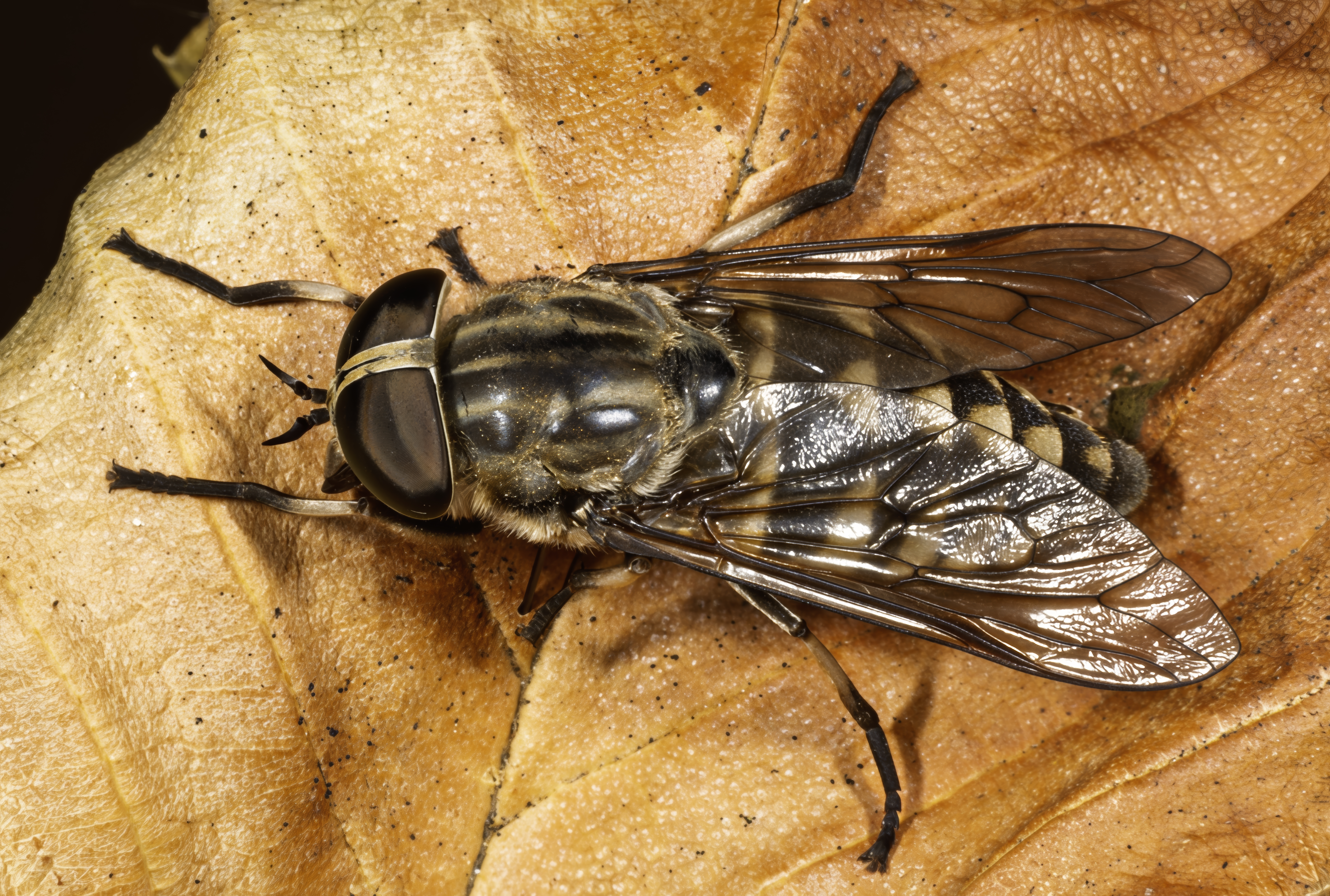

Scientific classification
- Kingdom: Animalia
- Phylum: Arthropoda
- Clade: Pancrustacea
- Class: Insecta
- Order: Diptera
- Family: Tabanidae
- Subfamily: Tabaninae
- Tribe: Tabanini
- Genus: Tabanus
- Species: T. autumnalis

Binomial name
- Tabanus autumnalis Linnaeus, 1761

Synonyms
- Tabanus brunnescens Szilady, 1914; Tabanus molestans Becker, 1914

= Tabanus autumnalis =

Species of insect

Tabanus autumnalis, the large marsh horsefly, is a medium-sized species of biting horse-fly. It is somewhat scarce compared to T. bromius and T. bovinus. This species shows slightly more of a preference for coastal marsh than some of the other European Tabanus, sometime even found in saltmashes.

== Description ==
Eyes without coloured bands. Male: postocular edge almost covered by the eyes and with a short fringe. Palps: second segment oval. Female: postocular edge narrower; interocular 4-5-6 times longer than wide; median plate bare, joining the lower one. Antennae: third segment with a blunt or short tooth. Wing has a hyaline costal cell.Abdomen: dorsal side with a lateral line of light spots placed between the midline and the lateral edge of the tergites, so that on the black background you can see five light longitudinal lines: one median, two lateral, and two marginal, separated from each other by four black lines. Wing length is 13–16 mm and about 16–22 mm in body length.
