= Tabanus petiolatus =

Scientific classification
- Kingdom: Animalia
- Phylum: Arthropoda
- Clade: Pancrustacea
- Class: Insecta
- Order: Diptera
- Family: Tabanidae
- Subfamily: Tabaninae
- Tribe: Tabanini
- Genus: Tabanus
- Species: T. petiolatus

Binomial name
- Tabanus petiolatus Hine, 1917

Synonyms
- Tabanus yulenus Philip, 1950

Species of fly

Tabanus petiolatus is a species of horse fly in the family Tabanidae. Unlike many Tabanus species, the colour pattern of male eyes is found in the larger, upper lenses - appearing as a dark, brown streak across the light coloured lens. Females of this species have uniformly coloured dark brown eyes. Often confused with Tabanus melanocerus or Tabanus trimaculatus.

== Distribution ==
United States.
