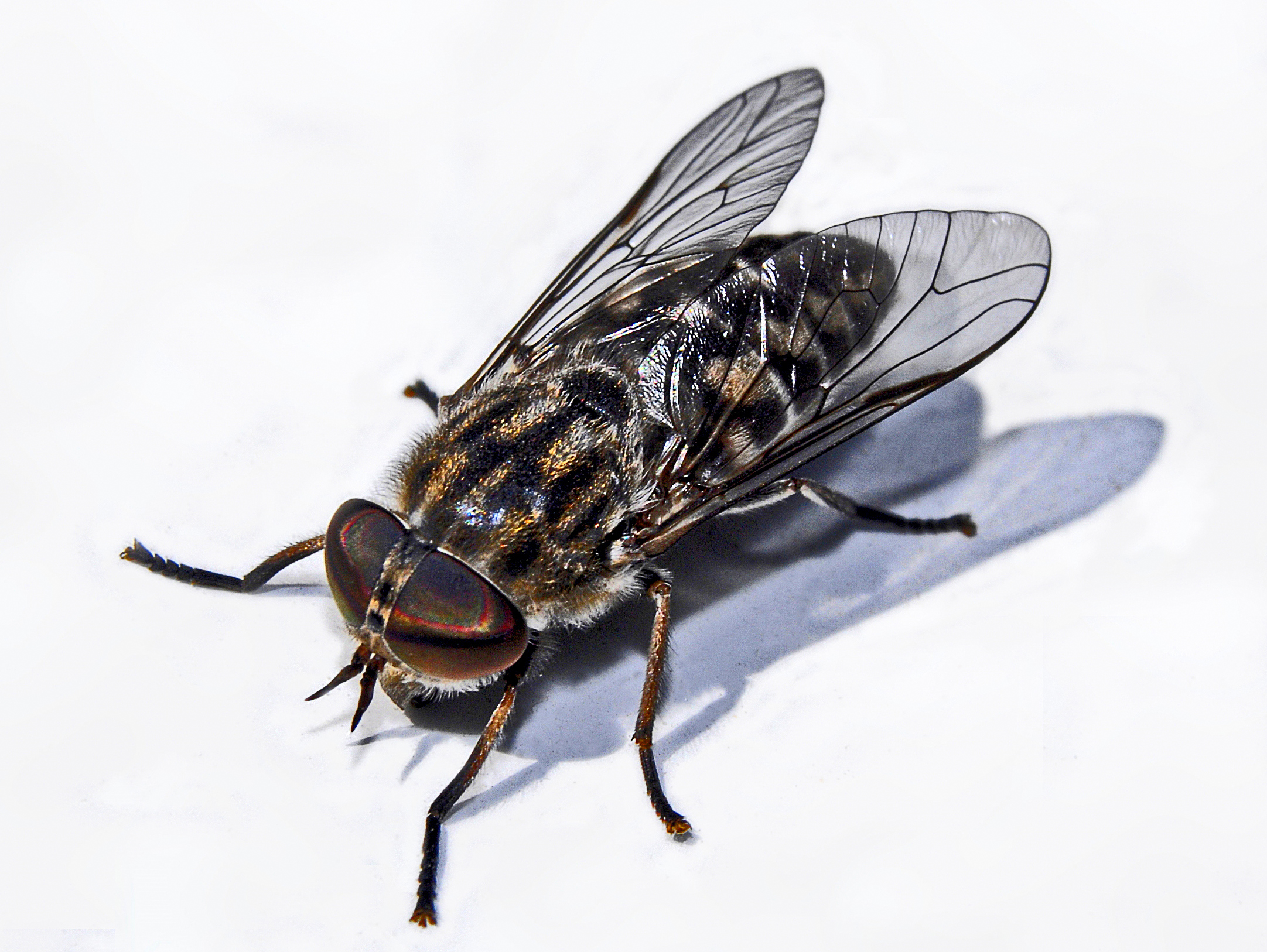
- Tabanus maculicornis ♀

Scientific classification
- Kingdom: Animalia
- Phylum: Arthropoda
- Clade: Pancrustacea
- Class: Insecta
- Order: Diptera
- Family: Tabanidae
- Subfamily: Tabaninae
- Tribe: Tabanini
- Genus: Tabanus
- Species: T. maculicornis

Binomial name
- Tabanus maculicornis Zetterstedt, 1842

Synonyms
- Tabanus nigricans Egger, 1859

= Tabanus maculicornis =

Species of fly

Tabanus maculicornis ♀

Tabanus maculicornis also known as the narrow-winged horsefly is a species of biting horse-fly.

== Distribution ==
This species can be found in most of Europe, in the East Palearctic realm (Russia) and in the Near East (Transcaucasus). It mainly lives in wooded areas with streams or in marshy grassland.

== Description ==
Tabanus maculicornis can reach a length of 12–13 millimetres (0.47–0.51 in). These quite small horseflies have a dark body. The abdomen of the females shows three rows of whitish or greyish triangles, with oblique sublateral markings on tergites 2 and 3. The head has a grey supraoccipital border. Females have scissor-like mouthparts that aim to cut the skin and then lap up the blood. The alula is narrower than in Tabanus bromius (hence the species common name). The eyes are green, but in males they show a broad purple band, while in females they have a coppery sheen and a single purple band.

== Biology ==
Adults fly flies from mid-May to mid-July, with a peak in late June. The females of this species are blood-sucking from grazing cattle (mainly cows and horses), but they mainly feed on nectar. They may also feed on human blood. Males only feed on nectar. Larvae live in boggy soil and in moss.
