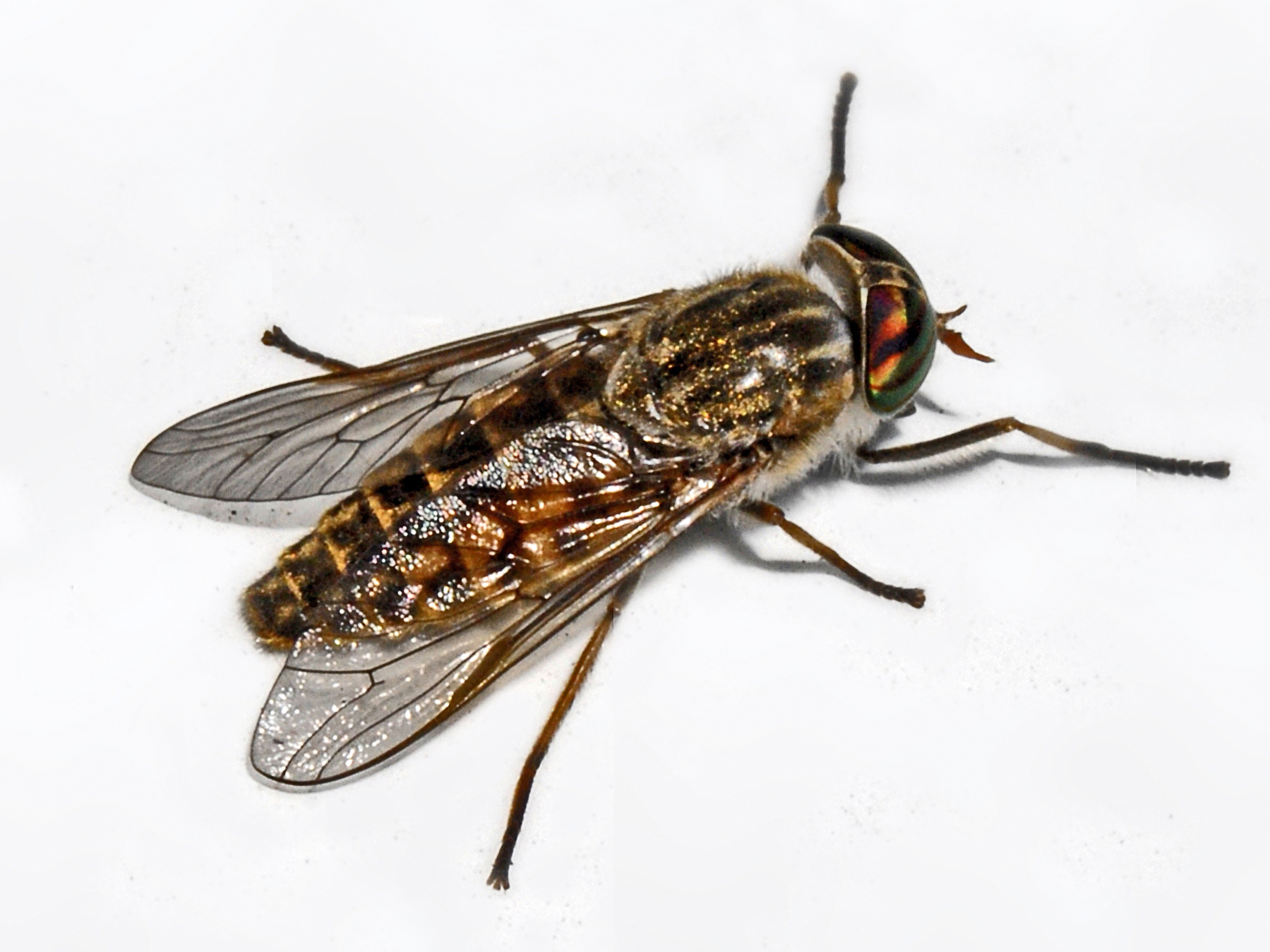

Scientific classification
- Kingdom: Animalia
- Phylum: Arthropoda
- Clade: Pancrustacea
- Class: Insecta
- Order: Diptera
- Family: Tabanidae
- Subfamily: Tabaninae
- Tribe: Tabanini
- Genus: Tabanus
- Species: T. glaucopis

Binomial name
- Tabanus glaucopis Meigen, 1820

Synonyms
- List: Straba rubra Muschamp, 1939; Tabanus castellanus Strobl, 1906; Tabanus chlorophthalmus Meigen, 1820; Tabanus cognatus Loew, 1858; Tabanus flavicans Zeller, 1842; Tabanus lunulatus Meigen, 1820

= Tabanus glaucopis =

Species of fly

Tabanus glaucopis, also known as the downland horsefly, is a species of biting horse-fly.

== Distribution and habitat ==
This species is present in most of Europe, in the eastern Palearctic realm (Russia, Mongolia, and China) and in the Near East (Turkey and Iran). These horseflies mainly live in wetlands, lakes and streams and edge of forests.

== Description ==
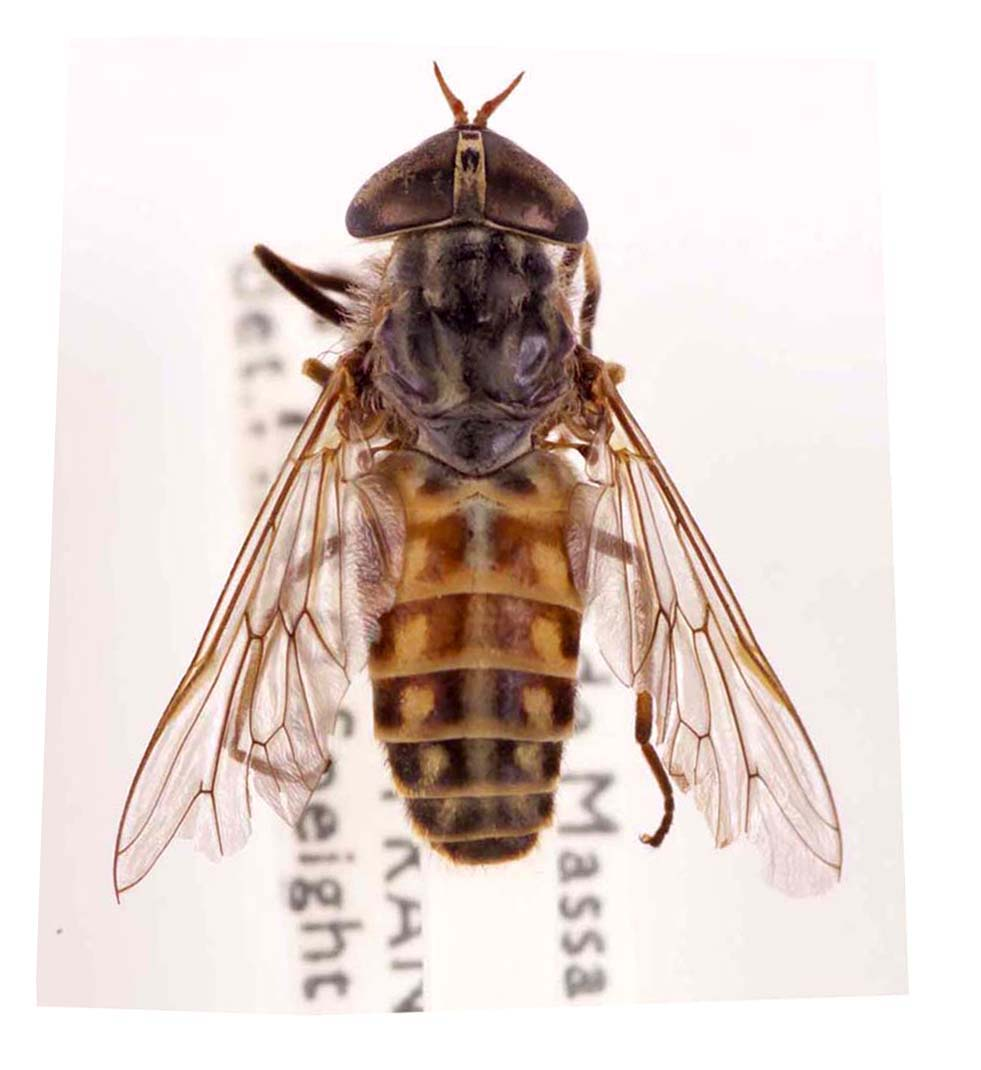
Museum specimen

Tabanus glaucopis can reach a length of 14–18 millimetres (0.55–0.71 in). These relatively large and slender horseflies have clear wings and green or green with red shades eyes.chestnut brown Tabanus glaucopis can reach a length of 14–18 millimetres (0.55–0.71 in). These relatively large and slender horseflies have clear wings and green or green with red shades eyes. The female's eyes have three bands, while in males they have just two bands.The eyes are without hair. The third segment of the antennae has a blunt or short toothThere is an isolated bare median front plate (postantennal) with the upper part hairless and glossy before the suture. In the female the interocular area has subparallel sides. Females have scissor-like mouthparts that aim to cut the skin and then lap up the blood. Thorax has greyish longitudinal bands.The wing costal cell is transparent. The abdomen is chestnut brown with a series of yellow-brown markings. Seguy states “Abdomen: dorsal side with a lateral line of light spots placed between the midline and the lateral edge of the tergites, so that on the black background you can see five light longitudinal lines: one median, two lateral, and two marginal, separated from each other by four black lines”

== Biology ==
Adults can be found from June to September. The females of this species are blood-sucking while the males feed on nectar. The females suck blood from cows, horses, but also people. These horseflies are strongly linked to grazing animals in open fields and they are probably very disadvantaged by their decreasing.
