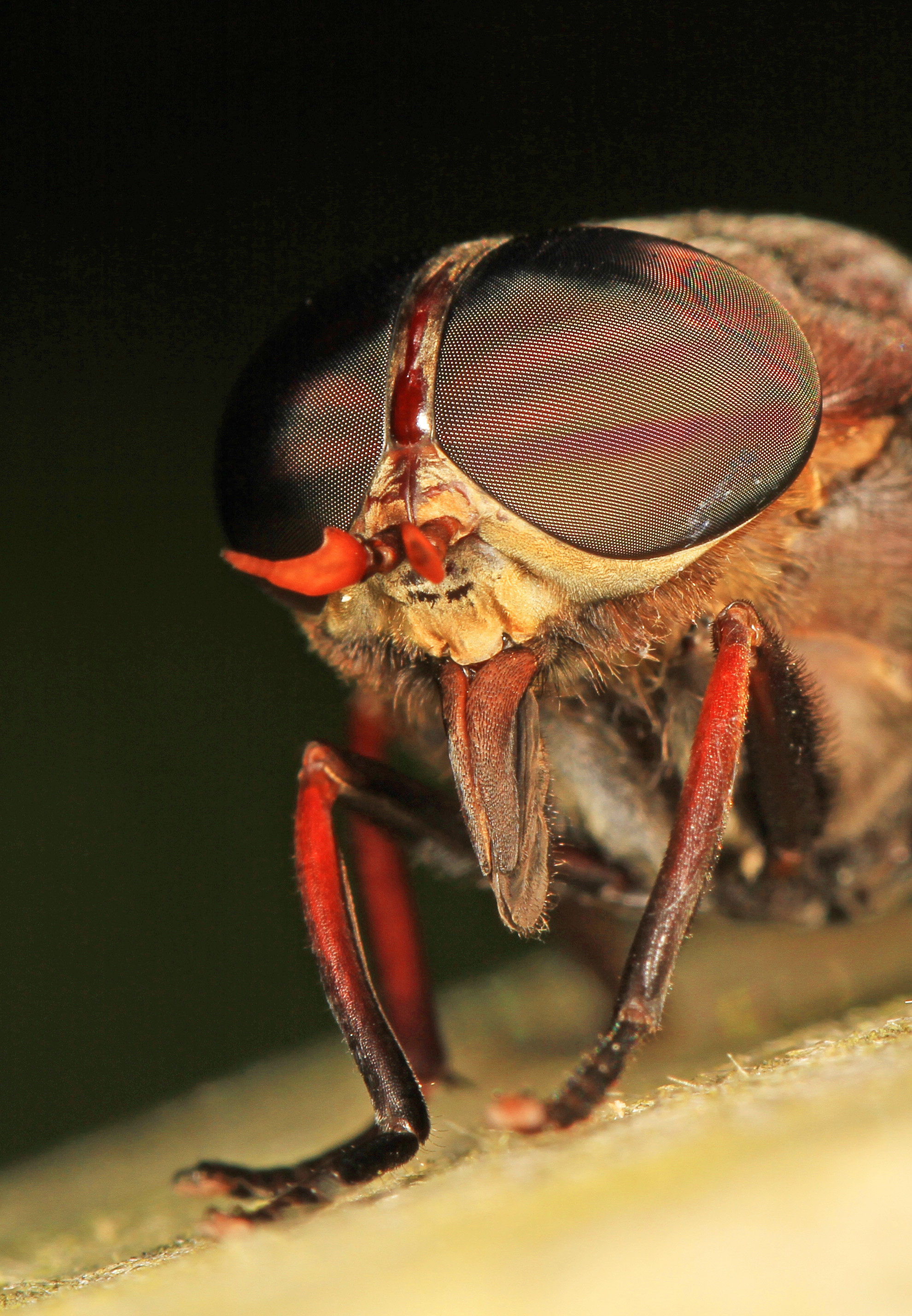

Scientific classification
- Kingdom: Animalia
- Phylum: Arthropoda
- Clade: Pancrustacea
- Class: Insecta
- Order: Diptera
- Family: Tabanidae
- Subfamily: Tabaninae
- Tribe: Tabanini
- Genus: Tabanus
- Species: T. americanus

Binomial name
- Tabanus americanus Forster, 1771

Synonyms
- Tabanus limbatus Palisot De Beauvois, 1806; Tabanus plumbeus Drury, 1773; Tabanus ruficornis Fabricius, 1775

= Tabanus americanus =

Species of insect

Tabanus americanus, the American horse fly, is a species of horse-fly in the family Tabanidae.

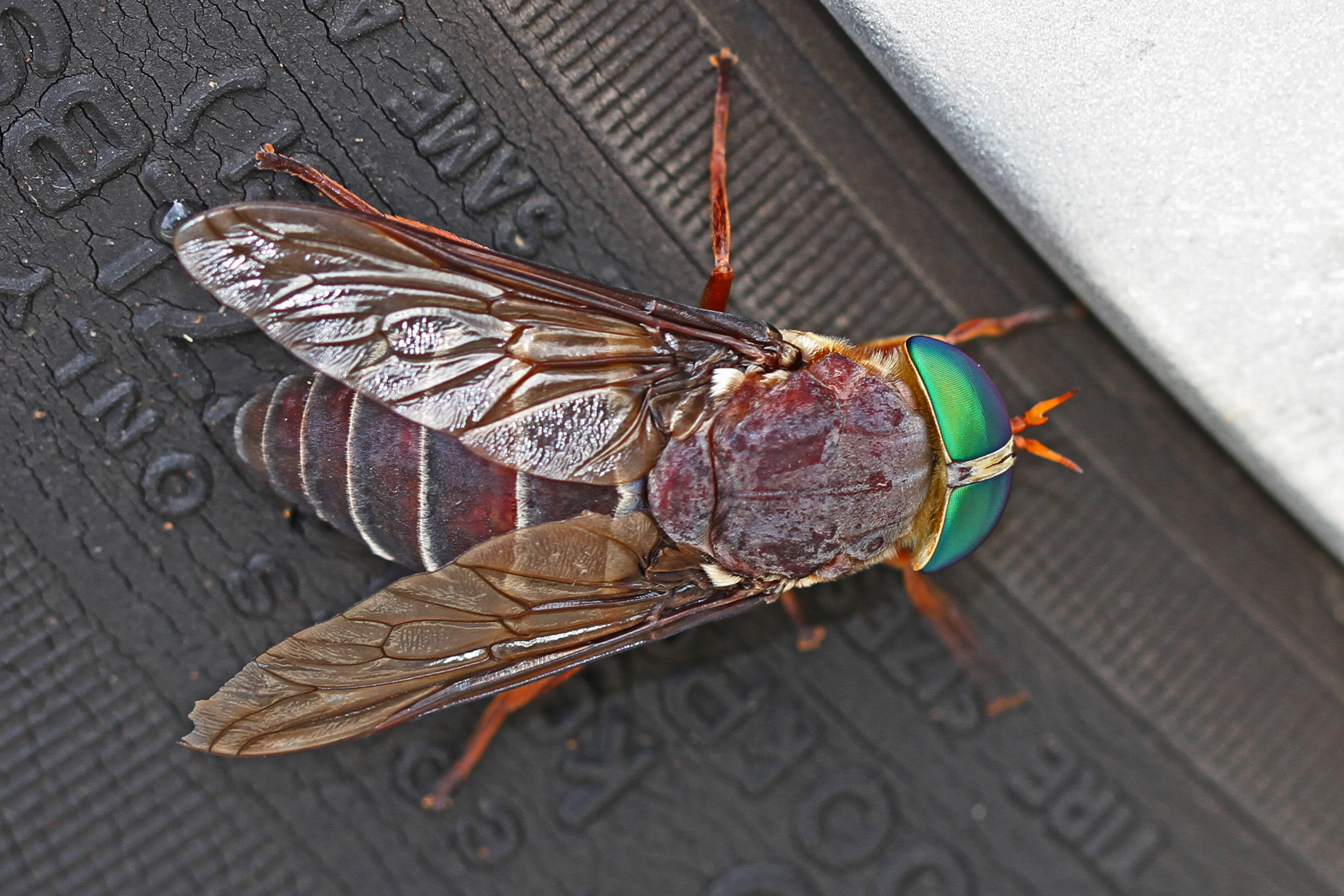
American horse fly, Tabanus americanus

== Distribution ==
The American horse fly is found in the United States and Canada.

== Habitat ==
These flies tend to stay around open pasture areas where cattle or livestock tend to be. They like ponds or any water source as this is where they lay their eggs.
