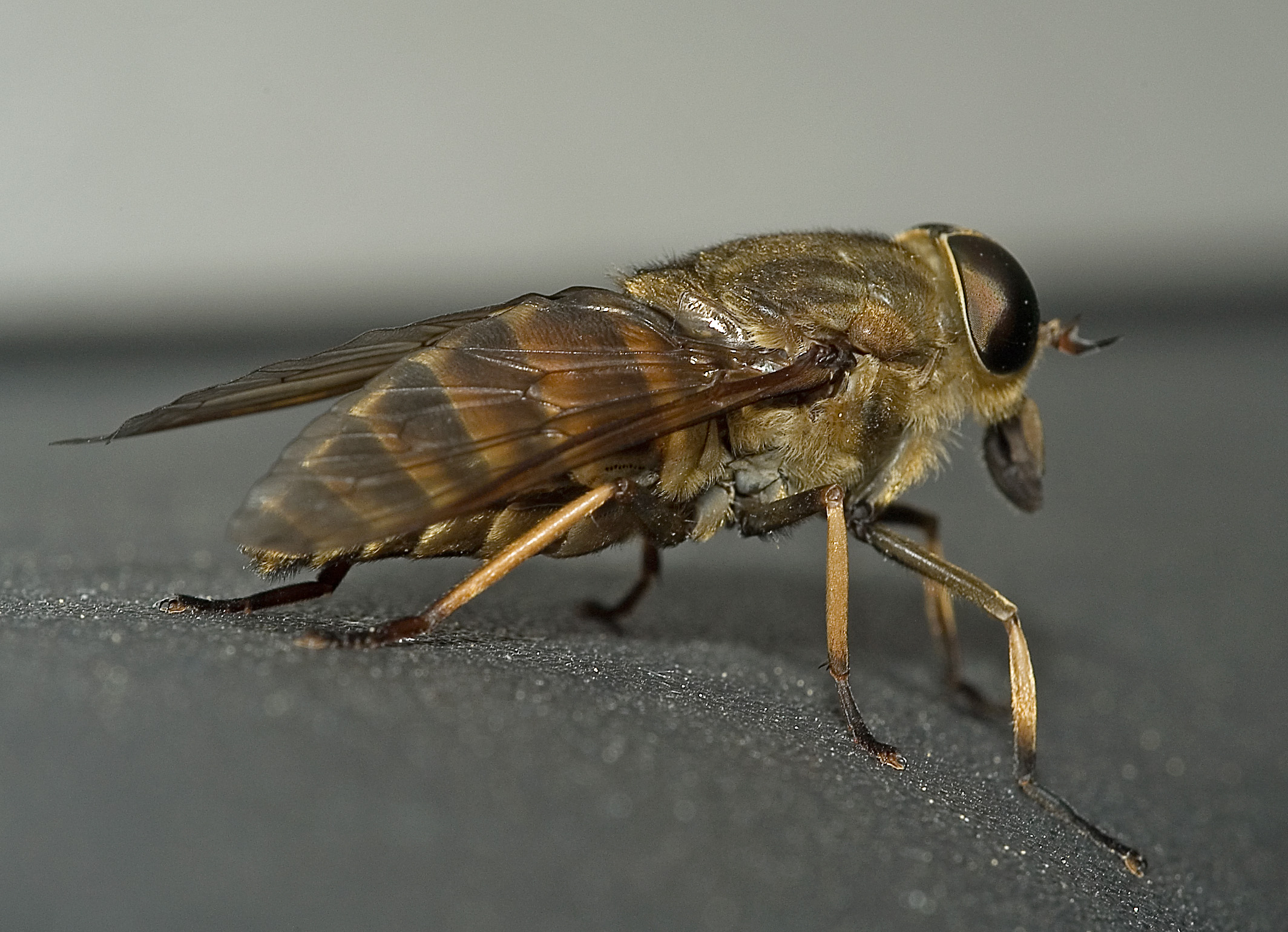

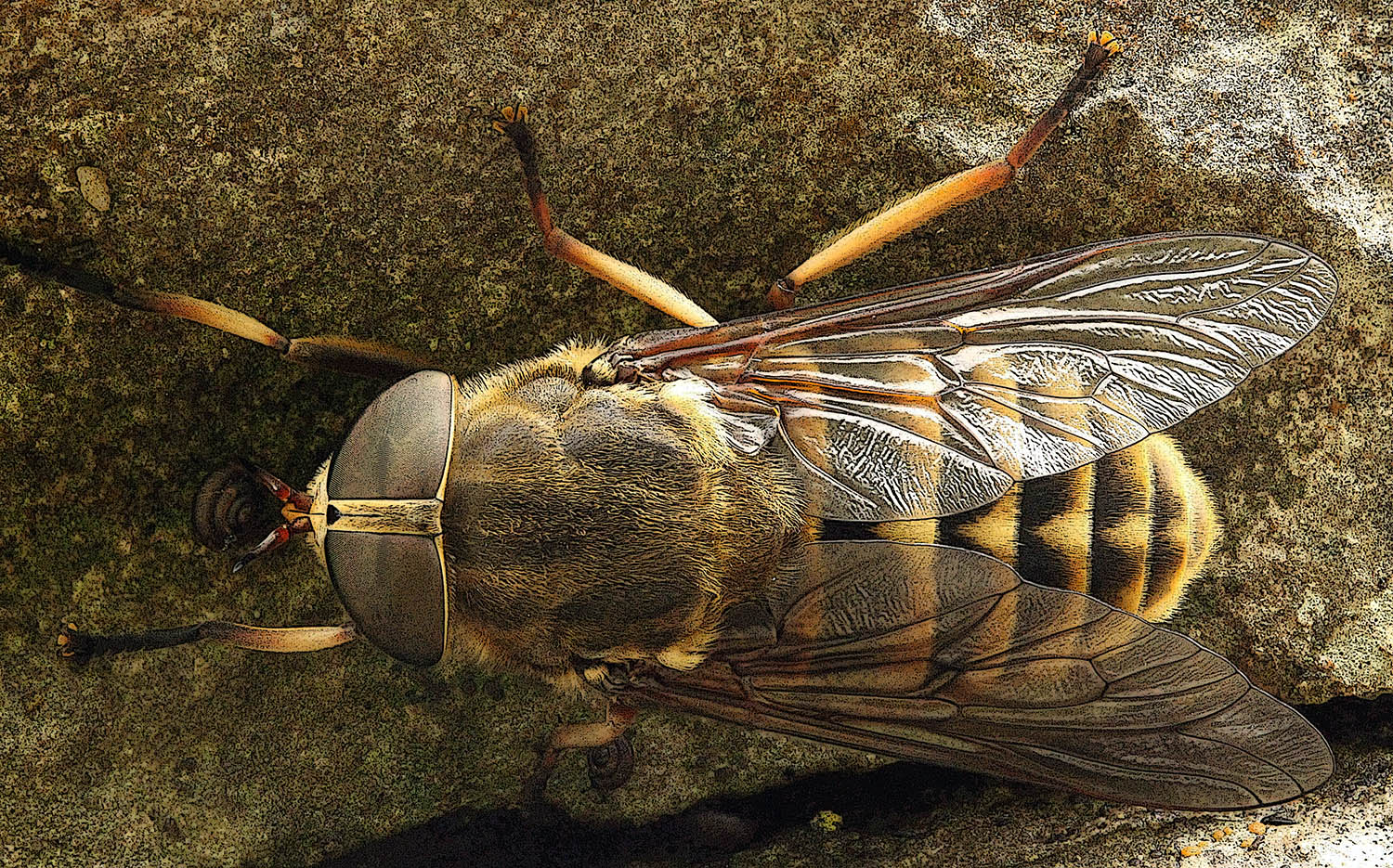

Scientific classification
- Kingdom: Animalia
- Phylum: Arthropoda
- Clade: Pancrustacea
- Class: Insecta
- Order: Diptera
- Family: Tabanidae
- Genus: Tabanus
- Species: T. sudeticus

Binomial name
- Tabanus sudeticus Zeller, 1842

Synonyms
- Tabanus verralli Oldroyd, 1939; Tabanus sudeticus f. confusus Goffe, 1931; Tabanus sudeticus f. distinctus Goffe, 1931; Tabanus sudeticus f. meridionalis Goffe, 1931; Tabanus sudeticus var. perplexus Verrall, 1909

= Tabanus sudeticus =

Species of fly

Tabanus sudeticus, also known as the dark giant horsefly, is a species of biting horse fly. It is the heaviest fly in Europe.

== Description ==
The dark giant horsefly's length is around 20-25 millimeters. They have uniform dark brown eyes. Diagnostic characters include:-Upper facets of eyes distinctly larger than lower facets, and sharply delineated from them. Subcallus entirely dull and tomented, (it may have brown (areas); venter of abdomen with each segment black basally, and in a rounded median extension; black species, with yellow abdominal triangles, but little or no lateral reddish colour. Parafacials with abundant black hairs.

Dark giant horseflies are a common species to be found buzzing around cows and horses. They usually only suck blood from horses and cows, avoiding humans. They fly with a very loud buzzing.

== Distribution ==
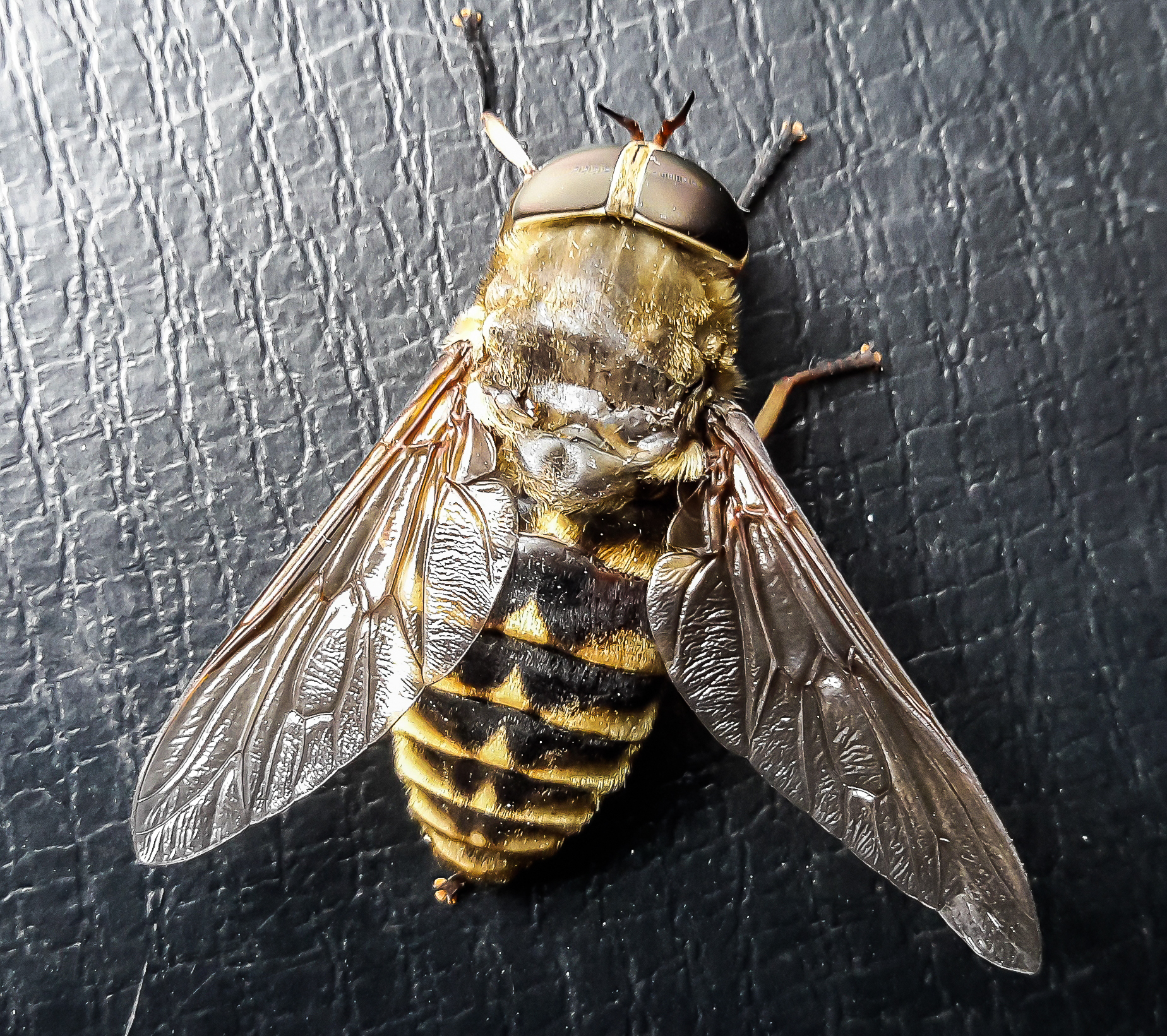
Female T. sudeticus

Tabanus sudeticus is found in many countries of Western Europe. It has a marked northern and western distribution; being found as far north as Southern Norway and the Western Isles of Scotland, and with an occasional record from Belarus.
