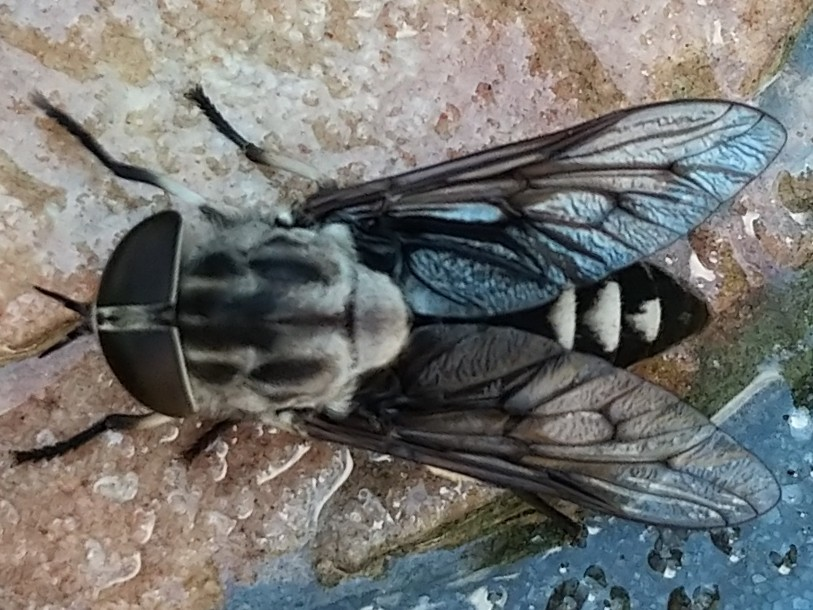

Scientific classification
- Kingdom: Animalia
- Phylum: Arthropoda
- Clade: Pancrustacea
- Class: Insecta
- Order: Diptera
- Family: Tabanidae
- Subfamily: Tabaninae
- Tribe: Tabanini
- Genus: Tabanus
- Species: T. trimaculatus

Binomial name
- Tabanus trimaculatus Palisot de Beauvois, 1809

Synonyms
- Tabanus quinquelineatus Macquart, 1834; Tabanus finalis Walker, 1854; Tabanus apicalis Walker, 1848

= Tabanus trimaculatus =

Species of fly

Tabanus trimaculatus is a species of horse fly in the family Tabanidae.

== Distribution ==
T. trimaculatus is found in the United States and Canada.
