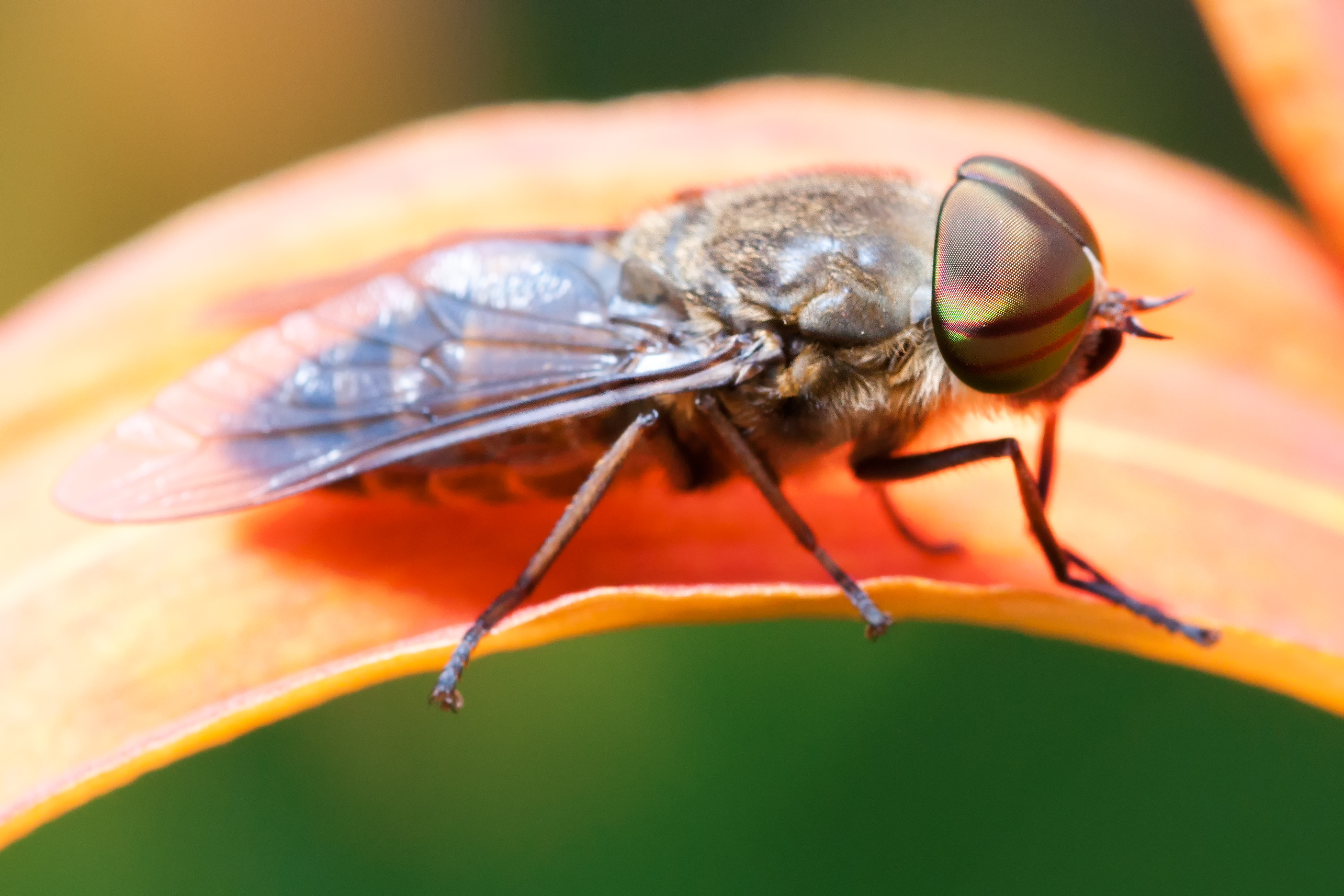

Scientific classification
- Kingdom: Animalia
- Phylum: Arthropoda
- Clade: Pancrustacea
- Class: Insecta
- Order: Diptera
- Family: Tabanidae
- Subfamily: Tabaninae
- Tribe: Tabanini
- Genus: Tabanus
- Species: T. bovinus

Binomial name
- Tabanus bovinus Linnaeus, 1758

Synonyms
- Tabanus auratus Ghidini, 1935

= Tabanus bovinus =

Species of fly

Tabanus bovinus, sometimes called the pale giant horse-fly, is a species of biting horse-fly. As the scientific name suggests, it prefers bovine animals as the source of blood, although it may bite other kind of mammals as well. The insect is relatively large for a horse-fly, adults usually being 25–30 mm long. Like most other horseflies, its compound eyes are very colorful with stripe-like patterns. Its body and wings are mostly colored brownish gray. It is quite fast and an able flier, being capable of evading most attempts to swat it with ease. It bites humans infrequently, because of its preference of bovine animals. This loud-buzzing horse-fly can be a nuisance, as it circles around its target and occasionally lands to deliver a bite (in the case of humans, the fly usually takes off again instead). However, to humans it is considerably less harmful than deer flies (Chrysops), which bite much more vigorously.

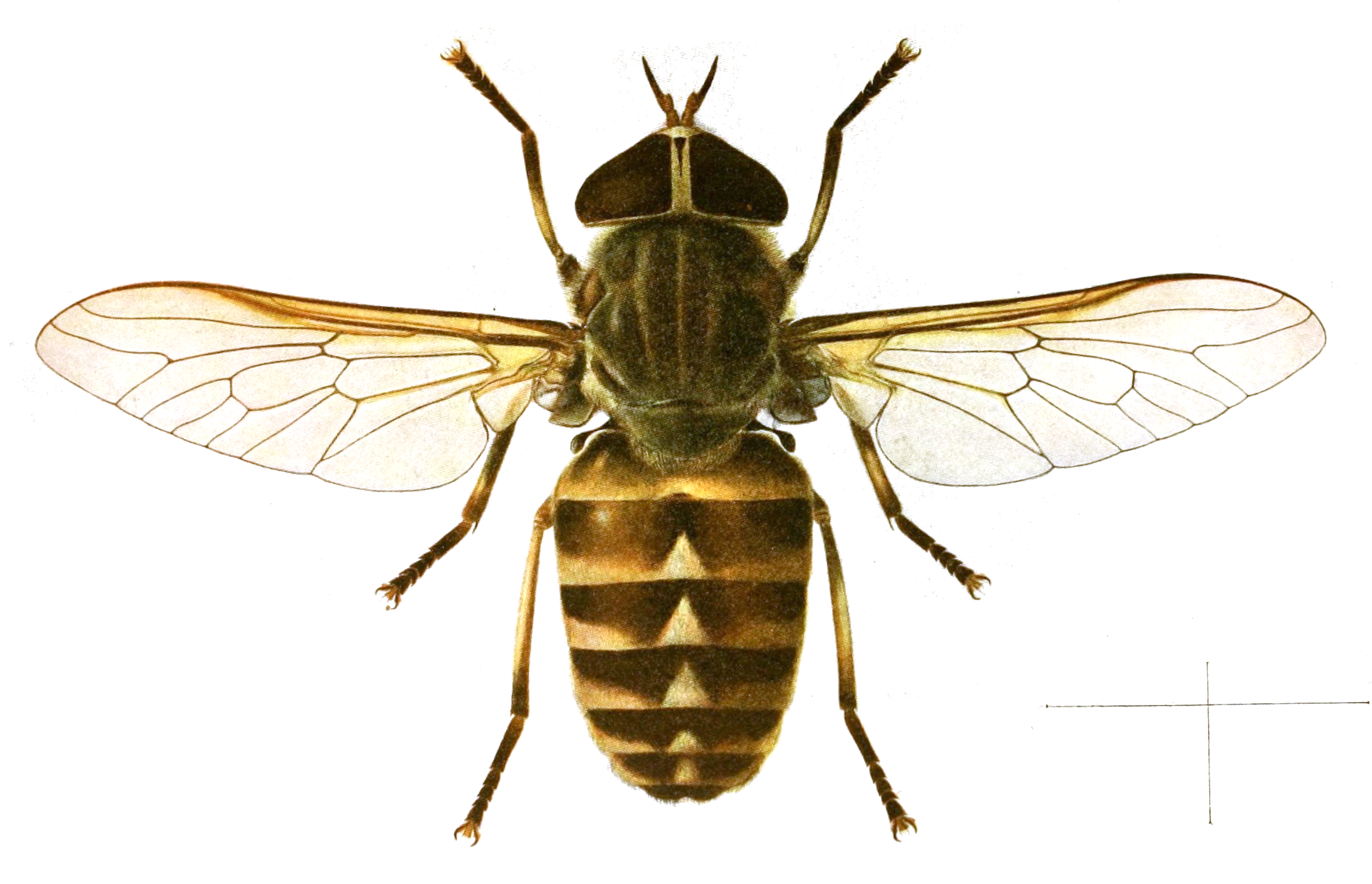
Female

There are no commercially available insect repellents that fully work against this horse-fly, however it usually avoids smoke and exhaust gases. Weather has a great effect on the horse-flies' behavior, as they only fly on sunny and hot weather.

Like all horse-fly species, it is only the females that require a blood meal, this is in order to provide sufficient protein to produce eggs. Males do not bite and tend to prefer the cover of woodland, where they are territorial.

== Technical description ==
Antennae: third article with closely set teeth at the base . Female: interocular with a bare lower plate widened at the bottom, more or less suddenly narrowed at the top, in a line extending to the middle.Sternites with a wide median band, black or brown, interrupted at the posterior edge. Halteres with a brownish knob. Female: interocular space more or less widened, with a widened and truncated or finely toothed lower plate which is hairless. Sternites are orange-yellow, with a black median band; the last segments are blackish. Male: eyes with subequal facets all over, emerald green. Abdomen: the grey triangles of the dorsal median band are elongated toward the anterior edge of the segments. Length: 20-21.5 mm.
