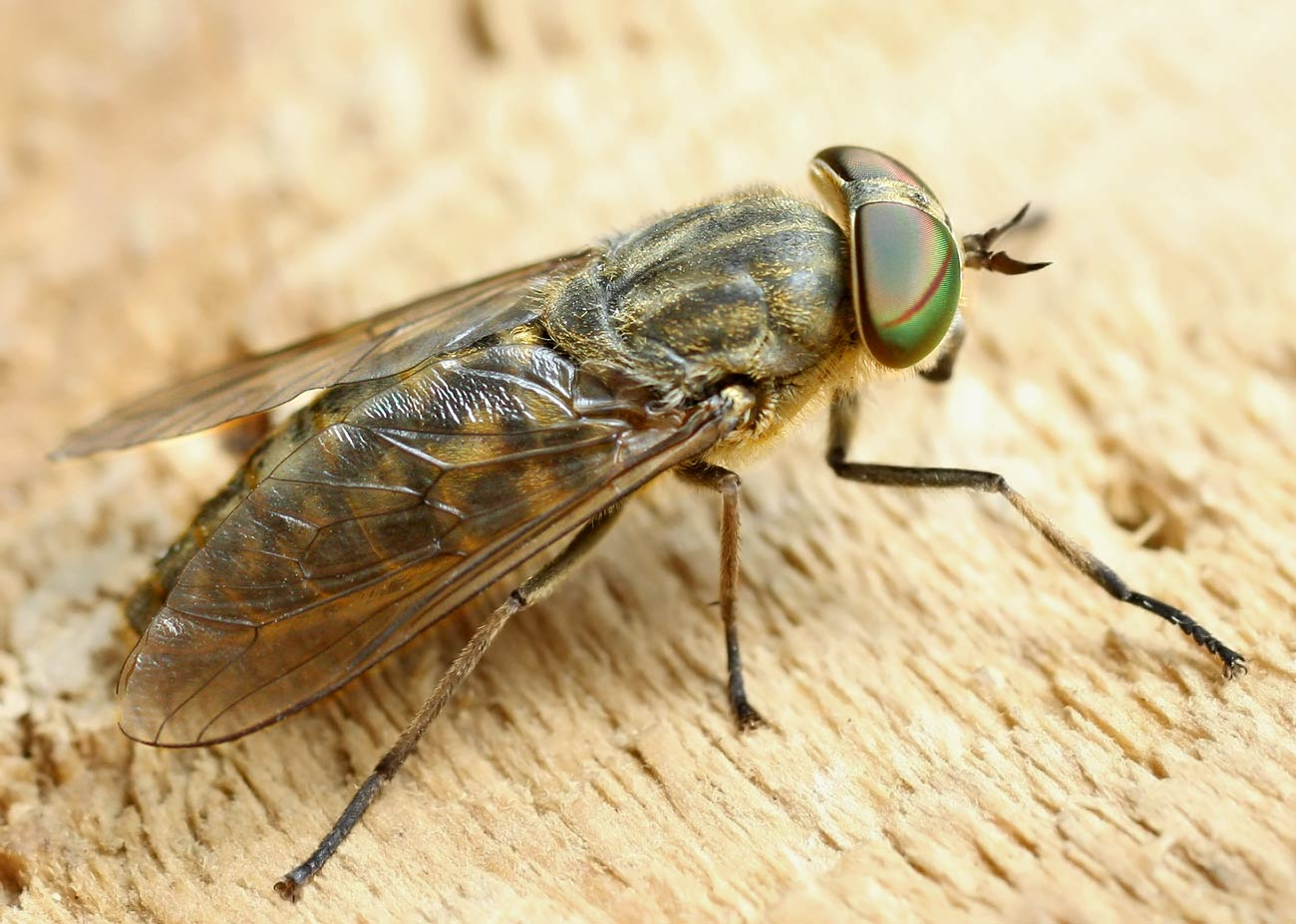
- Tabanus bromius female

Scientific classification
- Kingdom: Animalia
- Phylum: Arthropoda
- Clade: Pancrustacea
- Class: Insecta
- Order: Diptera
- Family: Tabanidae
- Subfamily: Tabaninae
- Tribe: Tabanini
- Genus: Tabanus
- Species: T. bromius

Binomial name
- Tabanus bromius Linnaeus, 1758

Synonyms
- Straba bromius ab. simplex Muschamp, 1939; Tabanus anthophilus Loew, 1858; Tabanus bronicus Gimmerthal, 1847; Tabanus connexus Walker, 1856; Tabanus glaucescens Schiner, 1860; Tabanus glaucus Meigen, 1820; Tabanus maculatus De Geer, 1776; Tabanus nigricans Szilády, 1914; Tabanus scalaris Wiedemann, 1820

= Tabanus bromius =

Species of fly

Tabanus bromius, sometimes called the band-eyed brown horsefly, is a species of biting horseflies.

== Description ==
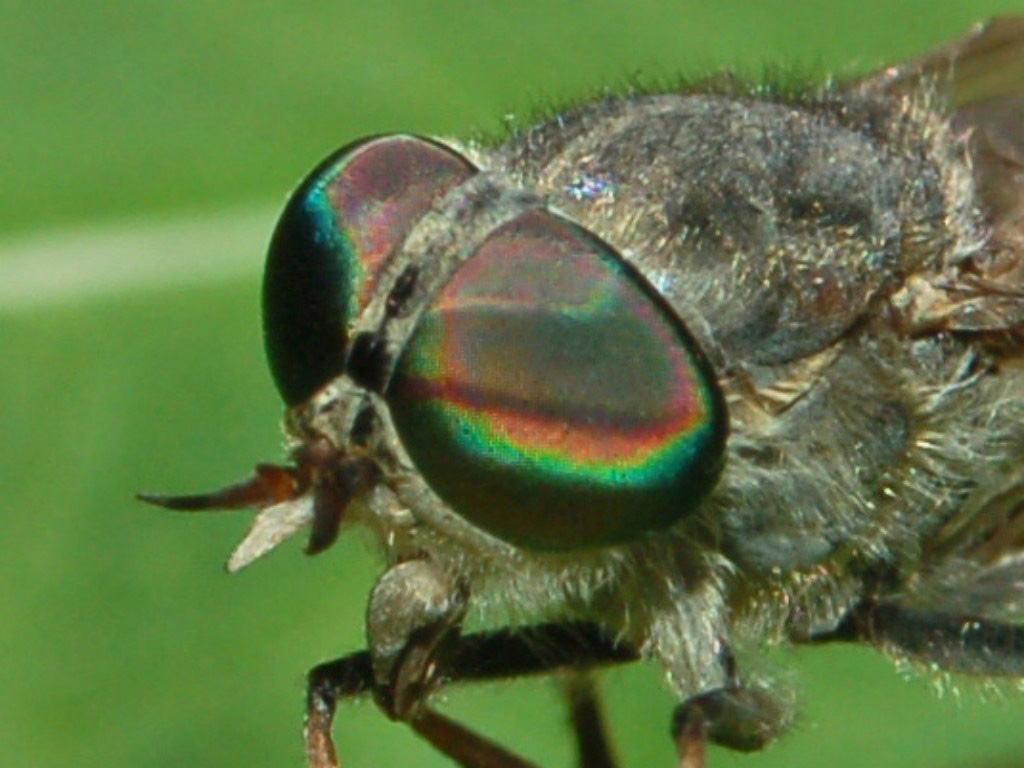
Close-up on eyes of Tabanus bromius

Tabanus bromius is one of the smaller European Tabanus, at about 13.5–15 millimetres (0.5–0.6 in) body length.

The mesonotum is grayish and bears on the top five indistinct longitudinal lines, while the abdomen is black, hairy and carries three rows of yellowish spots. The ventral side of the abdomen is light gray. The head is silver-gray and the compound eyes are green, with a violet-red transversal band. The wings are transparent, have brown veins and a length of 10.5–11 millimetres (0.41–0.43 in).

The females of these flies are bloodsuckers, feeding on mammalian blood, mainly cattle and horses, but they can also bite humans. The males feed on nectar, especially on Angelica sylvestris. The activity of these horseflies takes place in plain daylight, preferably in hot and muggy days and in the absence of wind. They are particularly aggressive during the full and late summer and bites cause painful welts.

The adult horsefly flies from late May until early September.

== Distribution ==
This species is widespread in most of Europe, in the eastern Palearctic realm, in North Africa, and in the Near East.

== Habitat ==
These horseflies prefer open spaces, such as hills or sparsely wooded areas.
