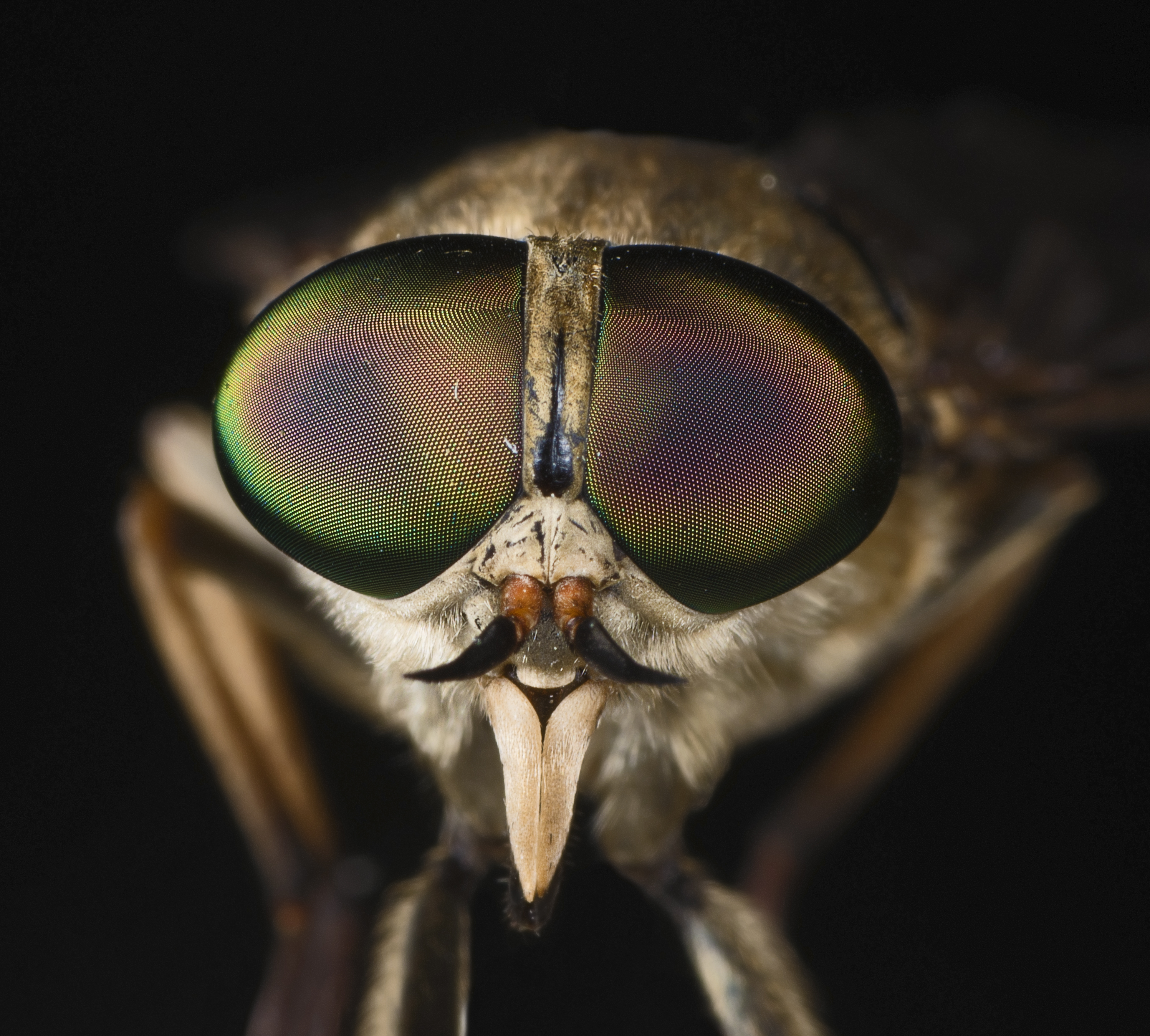
- Tabanus sudeticus

Scientific classification
- Kingdom: Animalia
- Phylum: Arthropoda
- Class: Insecta
- Order: Diptera
- Family: Tabanidae
- Subfamily: Tabaninae
- Tribe: Tabanini
- Genus: Tabanus; Linnaeus, 1758

= Tabanus =

Genus of insects

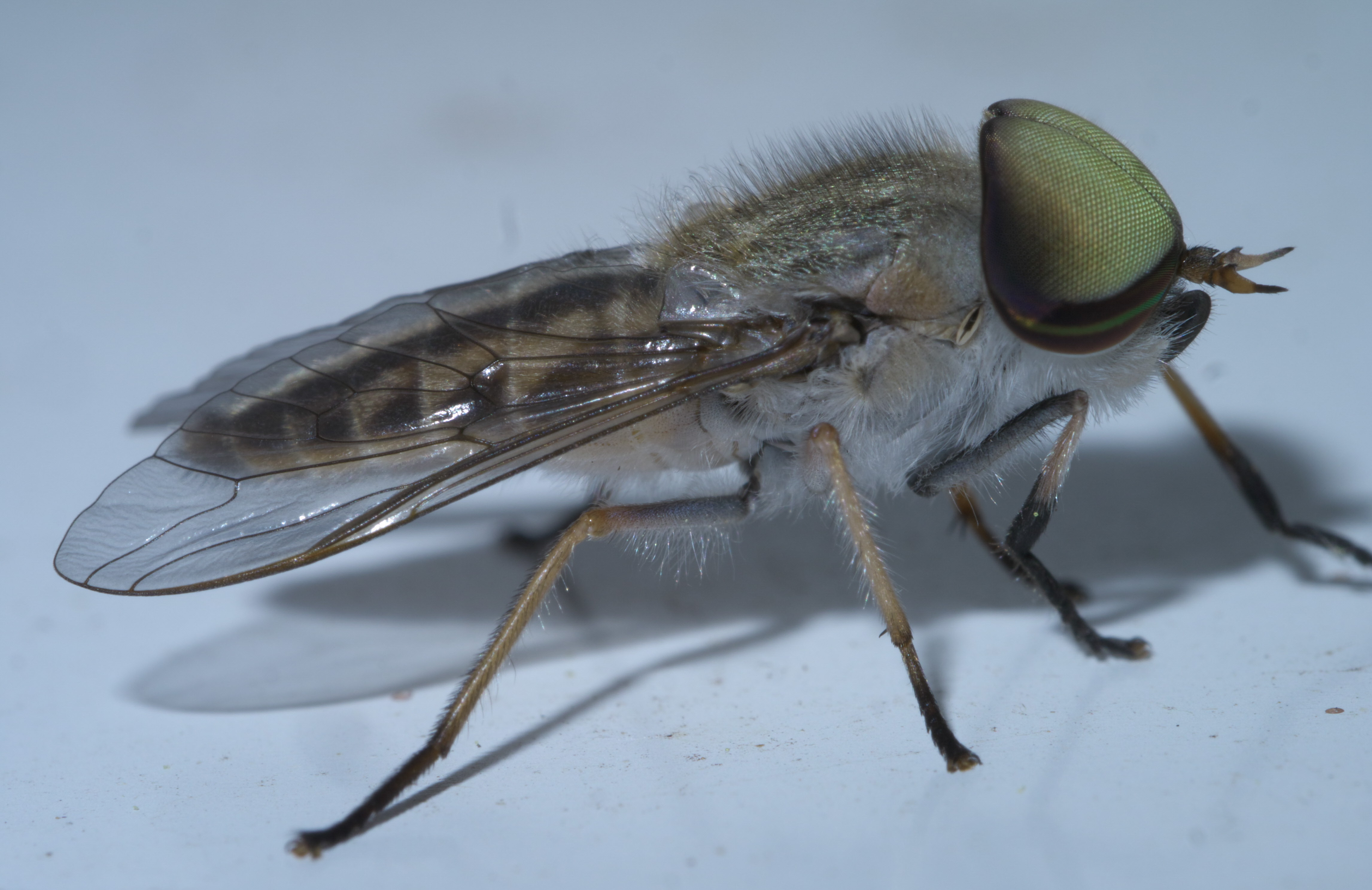

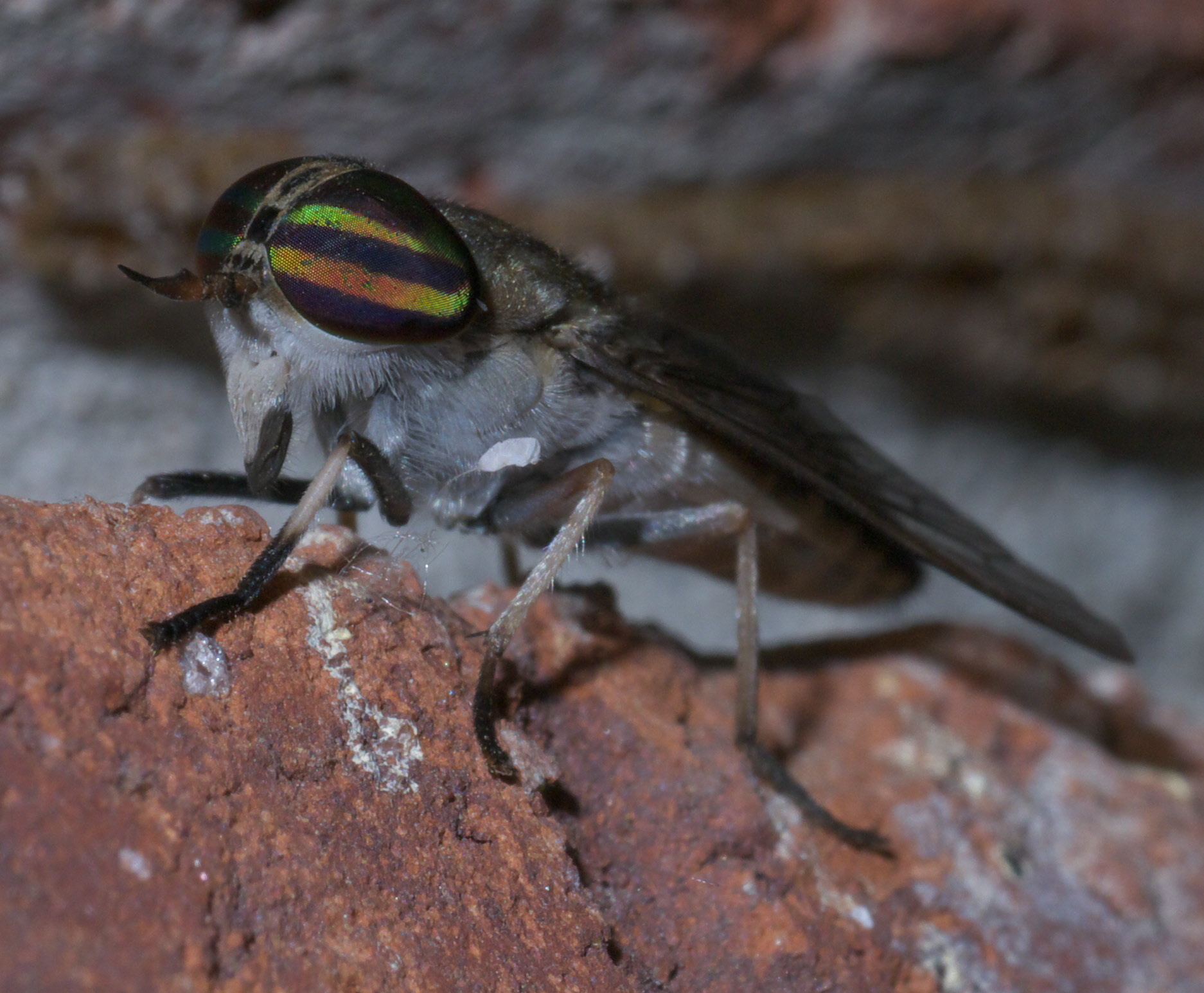

Tabanus is a genus of biting horseflies of the family Tabanidae. Females have scissor-like mouthparts that are able to penetrate the skin of livestock animals. The horsefly can then extract and ingest the animal's blood. Horseflies of this genus are known to be potential vectors of anthrax, worms and trypanosomes. Some species, such as Tabanus bovinus, prefer bovine animals and are less harmful to humans. The genus contains hundreds of species and many species groups.

== See also ==
- List of Tabanus species
